= List of people with locked-in syndrome =

This is a list of people publicly known to have locked-in syndrome, a syndrome where a patient is conscious and self-aware but suffers from some level of paralysis. Classical locked-in syndrome involves loss of all voluntary muscle control except those for eye movement. Complete locked-in syndrome involves a loss of all voluntary muscle control, including the eyes, while in incomplete locked-in syndrome, the patient may retain use of some small muscles, such as slight finger motion or small head movements. These patients retain cognitive function, hearing, vision, and consciousness, and often follow normal sleep cycles.

== Gil Avni ==
Israeli citizen Gil Avni, then 33, experienced complete locked-in syndrome (CLIS) at Meir Hospital, Kefar Sava, Israel, after experiencing an unknown health impacting incident at his home while watching TV. When Avni's wife, Orit, a nurse, arrived home, she found him bearing a pulse rate of about 160, making 50 breaths per minute, with symptoms of cyanosis, and called an ambulance. During transport, a dangerously low oxygen saturation of 50% was detected. When reaching the hospital, Avni was anesthetized and ventilated, later after a CT scan, he was diagnosed with cerebral edema. Avni, since arriving at the hospital, consciously experienced and remembered most if not all of his surroundings audio-visually, later auditory (with eye lids closed), including after anesthesia.

Avni remained in hospital in critical condition due to continuing low oxygen saturation and pulse rates now reaching 180-200. After almost two days, when his family had already given him a last goodbye, his sedatives were reduced. This allowed him to regain the ability for eye movement, later full body control. At the same time, his oxygen saturation returned to normal, and lung ventilation could finally be removed. He has since fully recovered - apart from PTSD stemming from this experience.

Avni remembered and reported most, if not all, the conversations taking place during the hospital period, both days and nights, and was able to precisely cite conversations, and people encountered. The documentary film 44 hours covers his experience in his own words, as well as the reactions of his wife and friends, and those treating him in hospital, some of whom are first confronted with details of what Gil Avni reports occurred during the hospital visit - and confirm it.

== Jean-Dominique Bauby ==
French journalist Jean-Dominique Bauby had a stroke in December 1995. When he awoke 20 days later, he found his body was almost completely paralyzed; he could control only his left eyelid (as the other was sewn shut to prevent an infection). By blinking this eye, he slowly dictated one alphabetic character at a time and, in so doing, was able over a great length of time to write his memoir, The Diving Bell and the Butterfly; the memoir was adapted to the screen in a namesake 2007 movie. Two days after the book was published in March 1997, Bauby died from pneumonia. He was instrumental in forming the Association du Locked in Syndrome (ALIS) in France.

== Nick Chisholm ==
Nick Chisholm (born 1973 in Dunedin, New Zealand), the brother of Survivor NZ host Matt Chisholm, had a series of mini-strokes, culminating in a massive brainstem stroke during a rugby game at the age of 27 on 29 July 2000. He has since recovered some muscle usage, and has become a bodybuilder and a personal trainer for other disabled people. He cannot speak and communicates via pointedly moving his eyes around a clear plastic board with letters and numbers on it to spell out what he wants to say. On March 26, 2020, his wife Nicola gave birth to triplets, conceived with Nick via IVF.

== Rom Houben ==
In 1983, Rom Houben survived a near-fatal car crash and was diagnosed as being in a vegetative state. Twenty-three years later, using "modern brain imaging techniques and equipment", doctors revised his diagnosis to locked-in syndrome. He was initially reported as communicating by typing into a keyboard with his right hand, though the presence of a facilitator to move his hand attracted sharp criticism and strong doubts that Houben's communications were authentic.

In early 2010, Dr. Steven Laureys, Houben's neurologist, admitted that subsequent tests had demonstrated Houben had not actually been communicating via the facilitator, and Der Spiegel, which had originally "quoted" many of Houben's facilitated statements, retracted those quotes as being inauthentic. Laureys maintained the MRI data that had led him to diagnose Houben as locked-in still suggested he was conscious.

Houben's case had been thought to call into question the current methods of diagnosing vegetative state and arguments against withholding care from such patients.

== Tony Nicklinson ==
Tony Nicklinson was born on 2 April 1954. Nicklinson was a rugby union player and a successful civil engineer. At 58 years old he was paralyzed from the neck down after having a stroke in 2005. He was not able to speak or move any parts of his body apart from his head and eyes. He had spent two-and-a-half years undergoing therapy in a hospital before moving home in a wheelchair to be cared for by his wife, Jane, and his two teenage daughters Lauren and Beth. He described his life as a "living nightmare".

Nicklinson attempted to seek a landmark ruling in the British courts which would have allowed him the right to an assisted death, but he lost the case in the High Court. He died on 20 August 2012 at his home in Melksham, Wiltshire by refusing food. His family continued his case after his death, before it was ultimately rejected in the Supreme Court.

== Gary Parkinson ==
In 2010, former Premiership footballer Gary Parkinson had a massive stroke and was later diagnosed with locked-in syndrome. This, however, has not ended his career in football, as he is now part of Middlesbrough F.C.'s scouting analysis team, watching potential players on DVD and relaying the verdict to the Middlesbrough manager Tony Mowbray through blinking.

== Martin Pistorius ==
Martin Pistorius began developing locked-in syndrome when he was 12 years old. He went into a coma for two to three years, after which point he slowly regained consciousness but was unable to communicate this to others until he was around 19 years of age. Now capable of some movement and able to communicate with a speech synthesizer, Pistorius works as a freelance web designer/developer and has published a book about his life entitled Ghost Boy.

== Tony Quan ==
Tony Quan, a graffiti artist, was diagnosed with the nerve disorder ALS in 2003, which eventually left him fully paralyzed except for his eyes. Quan used the EyeWriter technology to communicate his art and has since had his work displayed in numerous art shows nationally.

== Emily Willis ==
Emily Willis is an American former pornographic film actress. In early 2024, while undergoing rehabilitation for ketamine addiction, she suffered a cardiac arrest that led to a coma lasting two months. This incident resulted in permanent brain damage and a diagnosis of locked-in syndrome, causing complete paralysis except for limited eye movement. As of early 2025, she remains in a critical state, receiving long-term care at a facility in Utah.
