= Howard Shane =

American autism researcher

Howard C. Shane
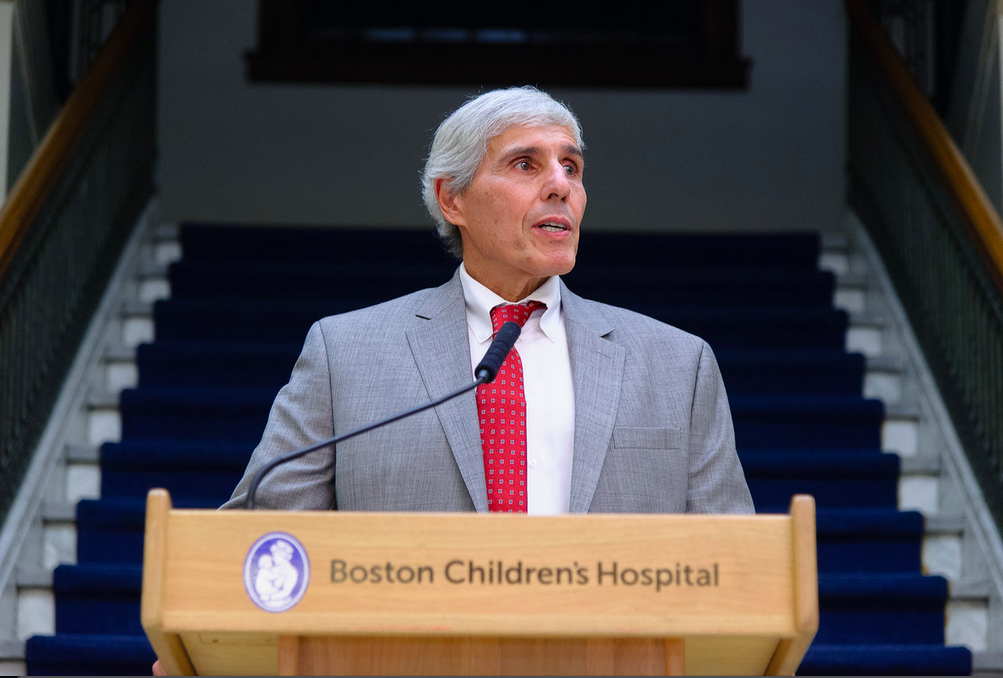
- Shane at Boston Children's Hospital
- Born: Leominster, Massachusetts
- Education: University of Massachusetts at Amherst
- Occupations: Speech pathologist, researcher, author, professor
- Medical career
- Field: Speech pathology
- Institutions: Center for Communication Enhancement at Boston Children's Hospital
- Sub-specialties: Communication enhancement for the disabled
- Website: childrenshospital.org/researchers/howard-shane

Howard C. Shane is director of the Autism Language Program and Communication Enhancement Program at Children's Hospital in Boston, Massachusetts, former director of the Institute on Applied Technology, and associate professor at Harvard Medical School. He is internationally known for his research and development of augmented and alternative communication systems to support the communication needs of people with neuromuscular disorders, autism and other disabilities.

== Education ==
Shane graduated from the University of Massachusetts at Amherst in 1969 with a B.A. in sociology. He went on to earn an M.A. in speech pathology and audiology in 1972 (also from the University of Massachusetts) and a PhD in speech pathology in 1975 from Syracuse University. He completed a doctoral fellowship in 1975 at the Mayo Clinic.

== Career ==
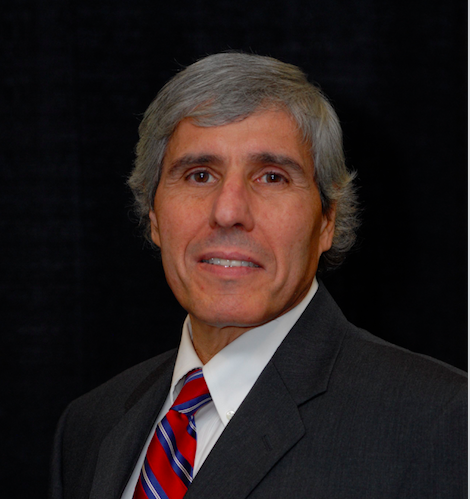
Howard Shane – 2014

Shane began his career as an assistant professor of communication sciences at the University of Vermont in Burlington, Vermont (1975–1977). He served as associate professor at Emerson College, Department of Communication Studies, (1977–1995), and visiting associate professor for the University of Massachusetts (1985–1990). Shane was an assistant professor at Harvard Medical School's Department of Otology and Laryngology (1986–1995) before becoming an associate professor (1996–present). Shane is also a professor of communication science and disorders at MGH Institute of Health Professions (1997–present). In 1977, Shane was appointed associate scientist of otolaryngology at Boston Children's Hospital.

Also in 1977, Shane was appointed the director of speech pathology and audiology at the Developmental Evaluation Clinic at Children's Hospital Boston. and held that position until 1991. In 1985, he was appointed director of the Communication Enhancement Center (CED), the augmentative communication program, at Boston Children's Hospital. In 2005, he assumed leadership of the Center for Communication Enhancement (which encompassed the old CEC and five other programs), a role he continues to hold as of February 2016.

For his lifetime achievements at Boston Children's Hospital, Shane was awarded the Center for Communication Enhancement's inaugural Directorship Chair in 2015. The endowed Chair, which will be named for him in future, is funded by the Boston Children's Hospital Otolaryngologic Foundation.

"Whether it be wheelchair mounted computers, finger-touch computer screens, voice banking prior to a procedure that takes away a child's ability to speak, or computer software applications, Dr. Shane has enabled thousands of children to communicate with the world around them."

— Michael J. Cunningham, Otolaryngologist-in-Chief and the Gerald B. Healy Chair in Pediatric Otolaryngology at Boston Children's Hospital

== Communication and technology ==
Shane has spent much of his career researching and developing assistive technologies that support children and adults, including Stephen Hawking, whose ability to communicate in spoken or written language forms is "limited by autism, cerebral palsy, language disorders, spinal cord injuries, or neuromuscular diseases." The systems have become so refined that a person does not need dexterity to activate a computer on their own and select letters, words or pre-programmed phrases from a screen. Small muscle movements suffice. Finger twitches, head nods and eye blinks, as well as the spoken voice for those with that ability, are all that is required for individuals to communicate independently.

If we can find some movement a person can control to use the computer, then we're on our way.

— Howard Shane

=== Touch 'N Speak ===
In 1983, Shane directed a program through his Institute on Technology to create technology solutions for students at Boston College. Other team members included Allen Field from Boston Children's Hospital, Katharyn Dawson, a speech and language pathologist, and Don Ricciato, principal of the school. The team was dedicated to designing and implementing teaching tools to assist people who were unable to speak in their efforts to communicate. The school worked with students whose ages ranged from 10 to 25 and who exhibited a wide range of neurological, physical and intellectual challenges.

This collaboration led to the creation of Touch 'N Speak, a software program that allowed students to use movement (i.e., of an elbow or head), to activate touch-sensitivity keyboards to access pre-programmed messages and activate a vocal mechanism. This also marked the first time that a computer (an Apple IIe) was successfully mounted on a wheelchair. Ground-breaking at the time, this was one of the first innovations in the field of "augmentative communication", recognized as a valid form of communication by the American Speech–Language–Hearing Association in 1981.

=== Microsystems Software ===
In 1989, Shane consulted with the programmers of Microsystems Software Inc., a company owned by Richard and Deborah Gorgens to develop software packages to assist people with disabilities in their efforts to participate in the workplace. The result was HandiWare, a collection of computer programs that ran on IBM-compatible PCs and sought to assist people with "physical impairments, visual impairments and those individuals requiring computer-aided speech." HandiChat, targeted for people with speech impairments, allowed individuals to type on a keyboard and have their words spoken through a DECtalk speech synthesizer. HandiWord, a "word prediction program", was responsive to individuals' most frequently used words and finished spelling out words based on the first few letters. At the time these programs were being introduced, the Americans with Disabilities Act was newly enacted. Communication technologies like HandiWare enabled individuals who had not worked in 10–15 years because of their communication difficulties return to and become productive members of the work place.

=== Starbright World ===
In 1995, a computer-generated play world called Starbright World was made available to the children's hospital, as well as other hospitals in New York, Pittsburgh and California, that allowed patients to connect through cyberspace. Starbright World, an interactive network financed by Steven Spielberg, was intended to help patients with serious and chronic illnesses escape in the world of play and, if desired, connect with others facing the same kind of diagnosis and treatment. Initially, access to Starbright World relied on a child's ability to use a mouse or type on a keyboard. Shane and his team worked to find alternate navigation techniques for children whose motor skills were impaired or for those who did not yet have the required computer skills.

=== Monarch School ===
In 2002, the Monarch School for Autism, in Shaker Heights, Ohio, began a collaboration with Boston Children's Hospital, and MGH Institute of Health Professionals to support children with autism in their use of communication and development of life skills. The Monarch School for Autism, an intensive one-one-one, language-enrichment program, was the first of its kind in Ohio, serving only children with autism whose needs are often under-served in the public school system. At the time, Shane had more than 30 years experience assisting people with autism and, as a result, had developed computer software specifically designed to "boost verbal communication skills" using visual information. The focus of the collaboration, headed by Shane, was to develop a curriculum using the software and other complimentary technologies reliant on visual cuing that could serve as a model for educational programs throughout the U.S.

We're giving them [students with autism] the ability to express themselves through a medium that is an effective one for them and to reduce the frustration associated with their difficulties in communicating.

— Howard Shane

=== Visual Immersion System ===
Shane led a team to develop the Visual Immersion System (VIS), a visual curriculum to support the communication needs of people with disabilities. The curriculum makes use of communication technology, including the iPad, which allows people with autism to engage in visual activities that aid in the development of language skills. The effectiveness of the program is currently under study, with clinical evidence "still emerging", but, as Shane states, "the excitement and interest in these technologies exist because they are working."

=== QuickPic AAC ===
With Christina Yu (Boston Children's Hospital) and Human–computer interaction scientist Mauricio Fontana de Vargas, Shane created the first artificial intelligence augmentative and alternative communication application for autistic users. QuickPic greatly accelerates the generation of vocabulary sets relevant to a given image, a useful tool used by speech language pathologists to teach grammar.

== Facilitated Communication ==
Facilitated Communication (FC), popularized in the early 1990s in the United States by Douglas Biklen, is an alleged communication technique in which the facilitator (usually a parent, educator, or caregiver) holds the hand, shoulder or arm of a person with disabilities in order to type on a paper letter board or mechanical keyboard.

In an interview with Susan Gerbic, Shane says that he first learned of FC in Sweden, when he attended an International Society for Augmentative and Alternative Communication (ISAAC) conference where Rosemary Crossley gave a speech. He questioned claims from promoters that individuals with severe disabilities, some as young as 5 or 6 years old, without formal training in reading or written language could produce messages that included "perfectly spelled sentences" and whether or not the communications were originating from the children or the adult facilitators. On the 1993 Frontline show, Prisoners of Silence, produced by Jon Palfreman, Shane questioned the sophistication of the sentences being typed using FC. Students, with the help of facilitators, were typing out grammatically correct and accurately spelled sentences that, according to Shane, held "insights that go far beyond their years." Proponents maintained that these children learned language and written language skills by being "immersed in language-rich environments."

Already versed in communications technology that allowed people with autism and a wide range of physical disabilities to communicate independently and without someone else's touch, Shane criticized FC as "bogus nonsense" and "a complete waste of time."

"It (Facilitated Communication) is not an accepted clinical practice and many associations have written it off because of its unreliability."

— Howard Shane

Shane became involved with FC further when he was called as an expert witness in a court case. The parents were accused of sexual abuse through facilitator Janyce Boynton who using FC with their autistic child. Shane established simple double-blind protocols to test the validity of the message and determine authorship of the messages. The results indicated that not only was the child incapable of typing out the messages, the content produced was based on facilitator's knowledge of the materials presented. In Facilitated Communication: The Clinical and Social Phenomenon, Shane outlines a "wide range of tasks and procedures", that practitioners can use to establish the source of the facilitated messages. Since that first court case, Shane has continued to serve as an expert witness with the results, to date, always the same. Rather than support people with autism in their efforts to communication, FC, according to Shane is "hurtful and harmful" and deprives "children of their right to independently communicate." Facilitator Boynton, realizing she had been the one doing the communication pressured her school administration to err on the side of caution and end the practice of FC. Over the years Shane kept in touch with Boynton and continued to encourage her to speak out about FC.

Shane believes that FC messages originate from facilitators who "subconsciously guide the hands and fingers of people they are assigned to help." via the ideomotor phenomenon. With regard to the ideomotor phenomenon and FC, the facilitators become so absorbed in the typing process, they are unaware of their own movements while holding onto their disabled communication partner. Shane stated on Prisoners of Silence:

You can't be a one-finger typist and not look at the keyboard. You just can't get oriented. You don't have a home position. And when you watch children who are F/C – facilitated communication – users, they may not be looking at the language board, but the facilitators are not taking their eyes off it. They're fixed on it.

Critics of Shane's stance on FC claim that testing is unfair to the person with disabilities who, they claim, might exhibit test anxiety or "freeze in their ability to respond."

Donald P. Oswald, who reviewed The Facilitated Communication: Clinical and Social Phemenon, praised the book for its "valuable perspectives on the FC story", citing chapters written by Jon Palfreman, Gina Green, Wolf Wolfensberger, Barry Prizant, and Shane that provide a "preliminary retrospective of the FC fad in the United States", but criticized the book for its sometimes "dispassionate discourse." He wrote:

The authors in this work occasionally reveal the personal distress they have experienced and as a result, at times the tone of their writing is defensive or aggressive. Nonetheless, this book offers valuable perspectives on the FC story and, depending on the reader's personal position, will stimulate, enlighten and, at times, enrage.

Supporters of FC state that often people start out using a facilitator and eventually learn to type without physical support. Shane responded by saying '"If someone’s going to be a typist, they don’t need somebody to facilitate them."'

== Memberships and appointments ==
- SpecialNeedsWare Advisory Board (Chair, 2012)
- Director, Model Autism Program (MAP), Boston Public Schools (2006)
- Director, Clinical and Research Liaison, Monarch School for Autism (2002)

== Conferences and summits ==
- Panelist with Matthew Goodwin, director of clinical research at MIT Media Lab and co-director of the Autism Technology Initiative at MIT, at the Third Annual Summit on Autism, hosted by Kids Institute for Development and Advancement (KiDA), University of California. Topic: technological advancements and their impact on autism. (September 17, 2011)
- Behavior Analysis Association of Michigan (BAAM) Conference, Eastern Michigan University, keynote speaker: "Using Technology to Educate Persons with Autism Spectrum Disorders: Do Professionals Get a Passing Grade?" (2009)
- The Herbert J. and E. Jane Oyer Annual Lecture on Communication Disorders and Human Development, Michigan State University. Topic: applying the visual strengths of person on the autism spectrum to communication intervention. (2008)

== Awards and honors ==
- Frank R. Kleffner Lifetime Clinical Career Award (2019), conferred on November 22, 2019 at the annual America Speech-Language-Hearing Foundation Founders Breakfast in Orlando, Florida
- Award for Significant Contributions to the fields of public health and science (2017), presented by the School of Public Health and Sciences at UMassAmherst
- Honors of ASHA Award (2007), presented by the American Speech–Language–Hearing Association
- Teacher of the year, MGH Institute of Health Professions (2002)
- Goldenson Award for Innovations in Technology, presented by the United Cerebral Palsy Association (2000)
- American Speech–Language–Hearing Association (fellow since 1989)
- Kleffner Clinical Achievement Award for Technology, Massachusetts Speech-Language-Hearing Association (1995)
- Pioneer Award for technology in clinical practice, Massachusetts Federation of the Council for Exceptional Children (1993)
- Finalist for technology innovation, Smithsonian Institution Computerworld (1989)

== Select books ==
- An Educator’s Guide to AAC: Supporting Communication and Language Learning (2026) with Leigh Anne White, Brooks Publishing, ISBN 978-1-68125-743-3
- Unsilenced: A Teacher's Year of Battles, Breakthroughs, and Life-Changing Lessons at Belchertown State School (2021)
- Enhancing Communication For Individuals With Autism, with Jennifer S. Abramson, Kara Corley, Holly Fadie, Suzanne Flynn, Emily Laubscher, Ralf Schlosser, and James Sorce. Foreword by Connie Kasari. (2015)
- Visual Language in Autism, with Sharon Weiss-Kapp (2007)
- The Children's Hospital Guide to Your Child's Health and Development, with Margaret A. Kenna and Alan D. Woolf (2001)
- Facilitated Communication: The Clinical and Social Phenomenon (Editor) (1994)

== Select articles ==
- The Persistence of Fad Interventions in the Face of Negative Scientific Evidence: Facilitated Communication for Autism as a Case Example, with Scott O. Lillienfeld, Julia Marshall, and James T. Todd (2015)
- Applying Technology to Visually Support Language and Communication in Individuals with Autism Spectrum Disorders, with Emily Laubscher, Ralf Schlosser, Suzanne Flynn, James Sorce, and Jennifer Abramson (2012)
- Using AAC Technology to Access the World, with Sarah Blackstone, Gregg Venderheiden, Michael Williams, and Frank DeRuyter (2012)
- Animation of Graphic Symbols Representing Verbs and Prepositions: Effects on Transparency, Name Agreement, and Identification, with Ralf Schlosser, James Sorce, Rajinder Koul, Emma Frances Bloomfield, and Lisa Debrowski (2011)
- There Isn't Always an App for That!, with Jessica Gosnell and John Costello (2011)
- Use of a Visual Graphic Language System to Support Communications for Persons on the Autism Spectrum, with M. O'Brien, and James Source (2009)
- Electronic Screen Media for Persons with Autism Spectrum Disorders: Results of a Survey, with Patti Ducoff Albert (2008)
- Facilitated Communication as an Ideomotor Effect, with Cheryl A. Burgess, Irving Kirsch, Kristen L. Niederauer, Steven M. Graham, Alyson Bacon (1998)
- An Examination of the Role of the Facilitator in "Facilitated Communication", with Kevin Kearns (1994)
- Selection of Augmentative Communication Systems: American Speech-Language-Hearing Association (1985)
- Decision Making in Early Augmentative Communication System Use (1981)
- Election Criteria for the Adoption of an Augmentative Communication System: Preliminary Considerations, with Anthony S. Bashir (1980)
