= Eoin O'Mahony =

Eoin O'Mahony may refer to:

- Eoin O'Mahony (politician) (1904–1970), Irish barrister, activist, genealogist, and raconteur
- Eoin O'Mahony (Gaelic football) (born 1962), member of the 1989 Cork All-Ireland senior football champion squad
- List of people with locked-in syndrome#Eoin O'Mahony
