= Philippe Vigand =

French writer (1957–2020)

- Born: 6 May 1957; Boulogne-Billancourt, France
- Died: 15 November 2020 (aged 63); Levallois-Perret, France
- Occupation: Writer

Philippe Vigand (6 May 1957 – 15 November 2020) was a French writer. He had locked-in syndrome.

== Publications ==
- Only the Eyes Say Yes: A Love Story (Putain de silence) (1997, English edition, 2000)
- Promenades immobiles (2000)
- Meaulne, mon village (2004)
- Légume vert (2011)
