= Anna Stubblefield =

American former philosophy professor and convicted sexual assailant

- Born: Marjorie Anna McClennen; December 3, 1969 (age 56)
- Known for: Sexual abuse of a man with severe cerebral palsy
- Status: Released
- Motive: Sexual gratification
- Conviction: Third-degree aggravated sexual assault
- Criminal charges: First-degree aggravated sexual assault (2 counts; overturned)
- Penalty: 656 days in prison (previously 12 years)

Details
- Victims: 1
- State: New Jersey
- Date apprehended: 2015

Marjorie Anna Stubblefield (/ˈɑːnə/; born December 3, 1969) is an American former professor of philosophy at Rutgers University–Newark and practitioner of facilitated communication who was convicted of sexual assault. Stubblefield was found guilty of raping a man with severe cerebral palsy when she reportedly believed to have communicated and gained consent from him using the discredited practice of facilitated communication. She was sentenced to 12 years in prison. In October 2016, the family was awarded $4 million in a civil lawsuit against Stubblefield. The 2023 documentary film Tell Them You Love Me covers the abuse case.

== Early life ==
Stubblefield grew up in Plymouth, Michigan, with her mother, Sandra McClennen, and her father. She was raised Jewish. During her high school years, Stubblefield wrote for the school newspaper, studied Braille, and learned American Sign Language.

== Academic career ==
Stubblefield received her PhD in 2000, and became "a prominent scholar in the field of Africana philosophy", the first white chair of the American Philosophical Association’s Committee on the Status of Black Philosophers, and the author of a book published by Cornell University Press titled Ethics Along the Color Line. In 2001, she became a philosophy professor at Rutgers University–Newark, where she also served as a faculty advisor to the university's Disability Services Office. Her university website described her as a "Facilitated Communication Trainer by the FC Institute at the School of Education, Syracuse University."

== Abuse and legal proceedings ==
In 2015, Stubblefield was found guilty of aggravated sexual assault against a man with severe cerebral palsy, which makes assessing his mental capacity with accuracy impossible. At the time the investigation began in 2011, Stubblefield was the chair of Rutgers-Newark's philosophy department, whose professional work centered on ethics, race, and disability rights, but she was subsequently put on administrative leave without pay and removed as chair of the philosophy department.

The victim was identified as D.J., a 33-year-old man with severe mental disabilities who cannot speak, has cerebral palsy, and is unable to stand independently or direct movements of his body accurately. Based on his disability, his mother and brother were appointed his legal guardians. Stubblefield stated that she had successfully communicated with him, determining he was of normal intelligence. She subsequently brought him to conferences where she "held him out as a success story". In 2011, she revealed to his mother and brother that she had had sexual relations with D.J. and said that they were in love, attributing consent to messages received while facilitating. Stubblefield stated that the two of them had a mutually consenting relationship established through facilitated communication. However, testing of D.J. by family members failed to establish the ability to communicate, and Stubblefield was thanked but denied further access to D.J. She continued to attempt to maintain contact with D.J. and began challenging control of D.J.'s legal guardians over him. In August 2011, the family contacted the police.

Stubblefield pleaded not guilty to the charges and said that facilitated communication revealed D.J. was mentally capable, while prosecutors said that facilitated communication was scientifically discredited and that D.J. did not have the ability to consent to sexual relations. Experts evaluating D.J. testified he did not have the intellectual ability to consent to sexual activity. Facilitated communication testimony from D.J. was not allowed as the technique was ruled unreliable under New Jersey law. Stubblefield's lawyer argued that an expert in F.C. should have been allowed to testify, as this could have convinced the jury that D.J. could consent to sex. The expert was prohibited from testifying since F.C. is considered a "junk pseudoscience". After a three-week trial, the jury found Stubblefield guilty of two counts of first-degree aggravated sexual assault, the equivalent of rape in New Jersey. After conviction, the judge revoked bail, saying that she was a flight risk. She was sentenced to 12 years in prison. This included requiring her to register as a sex offender.

Before sentencing, Stubblefield wrote to Judge Siobhan Teare, stating, "I was deeply in love... I believed that he and I were intellectual equals, and that our romantic relationship was consensual and mutually loving. I intended no harm, and I had nothing to gain".

In July 2017, an appeals court overturned her conviction and ordered a retrial on the basis that it was a violation of her rights to disallow her to use facilitated communication as a defense. In 2018, she pleaded guilty to "third-degree aggravated criminal sexual contact" and was sentenced to time served. In October 2016, D.J.'s family was awarded $4 million in a civil lawsuit against Stubblefield.

The 2023 documentary film Tell Them You Love Me by Nick August-Perna covers the story.

=== Reactions ===
The victim's brother spoke during Stubblefield's sentencing hearing, stating, "[Stubblefield] is not Sandra Bullock and this is not 'The Blind Side'... She raped my brother... She tried to supplant his life with some version of life she thought was better." At the end of the film, D.J.'s brother says that D.J. is "not a black kid from the ghetto needing someone to save him." In another scene, D.J.'s mother becomes irate when Stubblefield claims that D.J. does not like listening to gospel music and prefers classical.

Daniel Engber covered Stubblefield's trials for The New York Times. In 2018, Engber wrote:

"From my position in the gallery, reporting on the trial, it always seemed to me that Anna was entrapped by the grandiosity of her good intentions. As an academic, she devoted much of her career to social-justice activism and the philosophy of race and disability, warning in her published work that men like D.J. (who is black) were like 'the canary's canary' in the coal mine — 'the most vulnerable of the vulnerable' — and subject to both white supremacist and ableist oppression. In teaching D.J. how to type, using a widely disavowed method known as 'facilitated communication,' she believed she was restoring his right of self-determination: empowering him to take college classes, present papers at conferences and eventually express his longing for the older, married, white woman who had been his savior."

James Todd, a professor of psychology at the Eastern Michigan University and a vocal critic of facilitated communication argued that Syracuse University, where Stubblefield received her training, held some of the responsibility for the crime. In 2018, he said:

"For decades, the Syracuse administration has not only tolerated dangerous facilitated communication pseudoscience, it has even openly championed FC over clear and established science... It is not too late. Syracuse University can still renounce and repudiate FC. It can take real responsibility for all the harm left in its wake."

== Personal life ==
She was married to Roger Stubblefield, with whom she has two children.

== Works ==
=== Books ===
- Stubblefield, Anna (2005). Ethics along the Color Line. Ithaca, NY: Cornell University Press. ISBN 0-8014-4267-2.

=== Articles ===
- Stubblefield, Anna (1996). "Contraceptive Risk-Taking and Norms of Chastity". Journal of Social Philosophy. 27 (3): 81–100. doi:10.1111/j.1467-9833.1996.tb00254.x.
- Stubblefield, Anna (2001). "Races as Families". Journal of Social Philosophy. 32: 99–112. doi:10.1111/0047-2786.00082.
- Stubblefield, Anna (2007). ""Beyond the Pale": Tainted Whiteness, Cognitive Disability, and Eugenic Sterilization". Hypatia. 22 (2): 162–181.
- Stubblefield, Anna (2009). "Race, Disability, and the Social Contract". The Southern Journal of Philosophy. 47: 104–111. doi:10.1111/j.2041-6962.2009.tb00142.x.
- Stubblefield, Anna (2009). "The Entanglement of Race and Cognitive Dis/ability". Metaphilosophy. 40 (3/4): 531–551. doi:10.1111/j.1467-9973.2009.01603.x. JSTOR 24439800.
  - Reprinted in Stubblefield, Anna (2010). "The Entanglement of Race and Cognitive Dis/ability". In Kittay, Eva Feder; Carlson, Licia (eds.). Cognitive Disability and Its Challenge to Moral Philosophy. Wiley-Blackwell. pp. 293–313. doi:10.1002/9781444322781.ch17. ISBN 978-1-4051-9828-8.
- Stubblefield, Anna (2011). "Sound and Fury: When Opposition to Facilitated Communication Functions as Hate Speech". Disability Studies Quarterly. 31 (4). doi:10.18061/dsq.v31i4.1729.
- Stubblefield, Anna (2014). "Living a Good Life... In Adult-Sized Diapers". In Bickenbach, Jerome E.; Felder, Franziska; Schmitz, Barbara (eds.). Disability and the Good Human Life. Cambridge University Press. pp. 219–242. ISBN 978-1-107-02718-3.

== See also ==
- Annie's Coming Out – based on the case of Anne McDonald
- List of abuse allegations made through facilitated communication
