= John Clibbens =

John Clibbens FRSocMed
- Born: 1953 (age 72–73)
- Education: Bedford Modern School; Birkbeck, University of London
- Occupation: Professor of Developmental Psychology

John Clibbens FRSocMed (born 1953) is professor of Developmental Psychology at Birmingham City University, Head of Social sciences at Birmingham City University, a committee member of DASSH UK and an authority on language and cognitive development in children particularly deaf children and children with Down syndrome. Clibbens has published extensively and is a member of the Council of Deans of Health, the British Psychological Society, the Royal Society of Medicine, the Linguistics Association of Great Britain and the International Society for Augmentative and Alternative Communication.

== Early life ==
Clibbens was born in 1953 and educated at Bedford Modern School and Birkbeck, University of London (BSc Psychology (1980), PhD Psychology (1990)).

== Career ==
Clibbens has held numerous academic and managerial positions in universities including Head of School, Associate Dean and Dean roles in Psychology, Social sciences and Health at the University of Plymouth and the University of Essex, before assuming his current position as Head of Social sciences at Birmingham City University. Clibbens has also served on a wide range of regional, national and international bodies and ‘has supervised a substantial number of PhD students to completion’.

Clibbens is Chairman of the Undergraduate Education Committee and Deputy Chairman of the Research Board at the British Psychological Society. He is Vice-chairman of the board of Trustees for the charity Down Syndrome Education International and Chairman of its Research Ethics Committee. Clibbens served as a member of the Advisory Committee for the ESRC Deafness, Cognition and Language Research Centre at University College London for its first five-year term.

== Selected bibliography ==
- Coventry, K.R., Clibbens, J., Cooper, M. & Rood, B. (1997): Visual speech aids: a British survey of use and evaluation by speech and language therapists. European Journal of Disorders of Communication, 32, 203–216
- Coventry, K.R., Clibbens, J. & Cooper, M. (1997): Specialist speech and language therapists' use and evaluation of visual speech aids. European Journal of Disorders of Communication, 32, 315–323
- Clibbens, J. (1998): Research on the acquisition of British Sign Language: current issues. Deafness and Education, 22, (2), 10–15
- Moore, L.J.K., Clibbens, J. & Dennis, I. (1998): Reference and representation in children with Down syndrome. Down Syndrome Research and Practice, 5, 63–70
- Clibbens, J. (1998): The development of spatial reference in British Sign Language. Deafness and Education, 22, (3), 18–23
- Fowler, P., Clibbens, J., Newstead, S. (1996): Do Cross-Sentential Cues to Phrase Structure Facilitate the Acquisition of Syntax
- Cooper, M., Pettit, E. & Clibbens, J. (1998): Evaluation of a nursery based language intervention in a socially disadvantaged area. International Journal of Language and Communication Disorders, 33 (supplement), 526–531
- Feeney, A., Evans, J.St.B.T. & Clibbens, J. (2000): Background beliefs and evidence interpretation. Thinking and Reasoning, 6, 97–124
- Clibbens, J. (2000): Group discussion workshops in advanced undergraduate teaching: an evaluation. Psychology Teaching Review, 9, 11–15
- Clibbens, J. (2001): Signing and lexical development in children with Down syndrome. Down Syndrome Research and Practice, 7, 101–105
- Guijarro-Fuentes, P. & Clibbens, J. (2002): Las pruebas de gramáticalidad: ¿Instrumentos fiables en la recogida de datos en el español como L2? Revista Española de Lingüística Aplicada, 15, 53–71
- Clibbens, J., Powell, G.G. & Atkinson, E. (2002): Strategies for achieving joint attention when signing to children with Down's syndrome. International Journal of Language and Communication Disorders, 37, 309–323
- Evans, J.St.B.T., Clibbens, J., Cattani, A., Harris, A. & Dennis, I. (2003): Explicit and implicit processes in multicue judgment. Memory and Cognition, 31, 608–618
- Richards, L.V., Coventry, K.R. & Clibbens, J. (2004): Where’s the orange? Geometric and extra-geometric influences on English children’s descriptions of spatial locations. Journal of Child Language, 31, 153–175
- Guijarro-Fuentes, P. & Clibbens, J. (2004): Adquisición de las propiedades morfosintácticas del español por parte de bilingües en etapas avanzadas. Estudios de Sociolingüística, 5, 107–128
- Evans, J.St.B.T., Clibbens, J. & Harris, A. (2005): Prior belief and polarity in multicue learning. Quarterly Journal of Experimental Psychology, 58A, 651–665
- Cattani, A. & Clibbens, J. (2005): Atypical lateralisation of memory for location: Effects of deafness and sign language use. Brain and Cognition, 58, 226–239
- Cattani, A., Clibbens, J. & Perfect, T.J. (2007): Visual memory for shapes in deaf signers and non-signers and in hearing signers and non-signers: Atypical lateralisation and enhancement. Neuropsychology, 21, 114–121
- Clibbens, J. & Sheppard, M. (2007): Are children with learning disabilities really ‘children first’? A needs and outcome evaluation of policy. Social and Public Policy Review, 1, 2
- Clibbens, J. (in press): Signing and communication development in Down syndrome. Down Syndrome Research and Practice
- Merwood, A., McBrien, J. & Clibbens, J. (in submission): Diagnosing dementia in Down syndrome: a UK study of receptive vocabulary as a predictor of test performance using the DMR/DLD. Journal of Intellectual Disability Research
- Merwood, A., McBrien, J. & Clibbens, J. (in preparation): ROC curve analysis of the sensitivity and specificity of the DLD in adults with Down syndrome. Target journal: Journal of Intellectual Disability Research
- McBrien, J., Whitwham, S., Clibbens, J. & Ford, D. (in preparation): Predicting the capacity of residential homes to care for adults with learning disabilities and dementia: a pilot study. Target journal: Journal of Intellectual Disability Research
- Clibbens, J. (in preparation): Children’s earliest use of the indefinite pronoun “one” in expressive speech. Target journal: Cognition
- Griffin, M. & Clibbens, J. (in preparation): Evaluation of a health and fitness intervention in children with learning disabilities. Target journal: British Journal of Developmental Disabilities
- Clibbens, J., Pidden, S. & Powell, G.G (in preparation): Synchronicity in sign input by mothers of children with Down syndrome
- Griffin, M, Clibbens, J. & Pretty, J. (in submission): Using green exercise as a restorative for individuals whose mood and self-esteem have been perturbed by a negative task. Psychology of Well-Being
- Sheppard, M. & Clibbens, J. (in): An examination of the preventive process: a comparison of behaviour and education support team work with children’s services. Child Abuse Review
