= Facilitated communication =

Discredited communication technique in disabled care

Alternative medicine
- Claims: Disabled people may be able to communicate by pointing at letters or with a keyboard if physically held and assisted by an expert facilitator.
- Related fields: Alternative medicine
- Year proposed: Late 20th century
- Original proponents: Rosemary Crossley
- Subsequent proponents: Douglas Biklen

Facilitated communication (FC), or supported typing, is a scientifically discredited technique that claims to allow non-verbal people, such as those with autism, to communicate. The technique involves a facilitator guiding the disabled person's arm or hand in an attempt to help them type on a keyboard or other such device that they are unable to properly use if unfacilitated.

There is widespread agreement within the scientific community and among disability advocacy organizations that FC is a pseudoscience. Research indicates that the facilitator is the source of the messages obtained through FC, rather than the disabled person. The facilitator may believe they are not the source of the messages due to the ideomotor effect, which is the same effect that guides a Ouija board and dowsing rods. Studies have consistently found that FC is unable to provide the correct response to even simple questions when the facilitator does not know the answers to the questions (e.g., showing the patient but not the facilitator an object). In addition, in numerous cases disabled persons have been assumed by facilitators to be typing a coherent message while the patient's eyes were closed or while they were looking away from or showing no particular interest in the letter board.

James Todd called facilitated communication "the single most scientifically discredited intervention in all of developmental disabilities". Some promoters of the technique have claimed that FC cannot be clearly disproven because a testing environment might cause the subject to lose confidence. However, there is a scientific consensus that facilitated communication is not a valid communication technique, and its use is strongly discouraged by most speech and language disability professional organizations. There have been a large number of false abuse allegations made through facilitated communication.

== Overview ==
Facilitated communication is promoted as a means to assist people with severe communication disabilities in pointing to letters on an alphabet board, keyboard, or other device so that they can communicate independently. It has also been called "supported typing", "progressive kinesthetic feedback", and "written output communication enhancement". It is related to the Rapid Prompting Method (RPM), also known as "informative pointing", which also has no evidence of efficacy.

The person with disabilities, who is often unable to rely on speech to communicate, is called the communication partner, while the person holding their arm is called the facilitator. The facilitator holds or touches the communication partner's elbow, wrist, hand, sleeve or other parts of the body while the communication partner points to letters of the alphabet on a keyboard or other device. Biklen describes FC as provision of "physical supports under the forearm, under or above the wrist, or by helping a person to isolate the index finger to facilitate the use of communication aid" and contrasts it with "typing independently, with support by a hand on a shoulder, or hand on a sleeve, leg, or elsewhere".

One device popular with early FC users was the Canon Communicator, which printed a tape of letters when activated. However, two American companies were later charged by the Federal Trade Commission for making "false and unsubstantiated claims" that the device could enable disabled people to communicate using FC. The companies settled and stopped mentioning FC in their advertising campaigns.

Proponents of FC claim that the reason people with autism cannot communicate effectively involves motor issues such as apraxia, and that they "lack confidence in their abilities" but physical support helps them overcome this limitation. However, this claim is unsubstantiated. Research indicates that many non-verbal people with autism spectrum disorder are unable to communicate due to intellectual disability.

The facilitator is depicted as helping the patient with pointing to letters, controlling involuntary arm movements, avoiding mistakes, initiating movement, verbal prompts, and moral support. It is also claimed that the facilitator must believe in the patient's ability to communicate. Former facilitator Janyce Boynton, who came to reject the technique after taking part in blind testing, later reported that her training took for granted that the process worked, and that the complexity of facilitation made it hard to realise that messages were coming from her expectations and not from her patients:

When you're facilitating, you're so distracted by other things. You're carrying on conversations, you're asking and answering questions, you're trying to look at the person to see if they're looking at the keyboard...Your brain is so engaged that you lose sight of what's happening with your hand...that's what makes it feel like it's working because the more you practice it, the more the movements feel really fluid.

Scott Lilienfeld, the Dobbs Professor of Psychology at Emory University, writing in The Neuroethics Blog, admonishes practitioners of mental health practice not to ignore their "epistemic duties – responsibilities to seek out and possess accurate knowledge about the world", and wrote:

Ultimately, the proponents of facilitated communication very much wanted to help individuals with autism. But the facilitated communication tragedy teaches us that good intentions are not sufficient. Good intentions paired with grossly inaccurate knowledge and an absence of a self-critical mindset can be disastrous. This tragedy also teaches us that by not attending to their epistemic duties, professionals can do grave harm without intending to do so.

== History ==
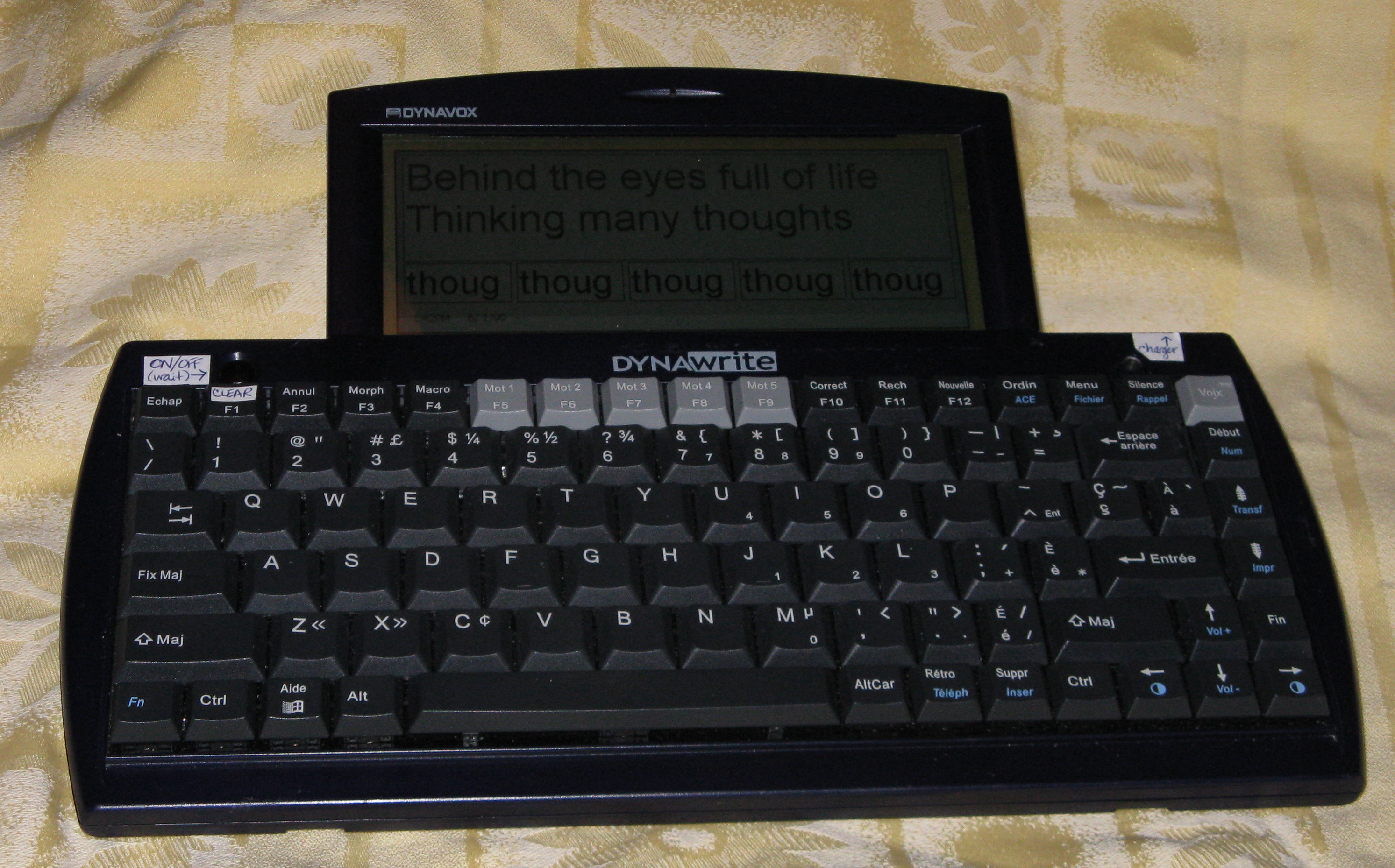
Keyboard of the type used in facilitated communication

Techniques similar to FC appeared around the 1960s, with early observations regarding facilitated teaching of children with autism being published by Else Hansen (Denmark), Lorna Wing (England), and Rosalind Oppenheim (U.S.). Studies were made in Denmark in the 1960s and 1970s, but did not have an impact outside of the country, and the debate there died out in the early 1980s due to a lack of scientific evidence.

In Australia, Special educator Rosemary Crossley independently created facilitated communication in 1977, where it became popular largely due to her efforts. It was popularized in the United States beginning in the late 1980s by Arthur Schawlow and Douglas Biklen. FC has also received attention in Asia and Europe.

Early users of facilitated communication praised it for its apparent simplicity. It was promoted as a "teaching strategy" that did not require objective evaluation or close monitoring. However, as early as 1991, more than 40 peer-reviewed studies had not only failed to demonstrate FC's efficacy, but indicated that any successes reported were due to facilitator influence. This influence is usually attributed to non-conscious movements, and it is thought that facilitators are genuinely unaware that they are controlling the communications.

In 1994, the American Psychological Association (APA), passed a resolution cautioning against the use of facilitated communication, citing the lack of scientific evidence. They also stated that information obtained via FC should not be used to confirm or deny allegations of abuse or to make diagnostic or treatment decisions. In recognition of the continued scientific evidence against the technique, this was followed by similar statements from the American Academy of Child and Adolescent Psychiatry (AACAP), American Speech-Language-Hearing Association (ASHA), and the International Society for Augmentative and Alternative Communication (ISAAC) In 1998, a British government report concluded that "the phenomenon fails to materialise once facilitator effects have been controlled. It would be hard to justify further research on this". By 2001, it was reported in a comprehensive review of peer-reviewed literature that "Facilitated Communication (FC) had largely been empirically discredited as an effective intervention for previously uncommunicative persons with disabilities, especially those with autism and related disorders. Key empirical findings consistently showed that the facilitator and not the client initiated communication."

Many people believed FC had passed its peak, characterizing it as a fad and pseudoscientific. However, promotion of the technique continued, with supporters dismissing empirical investigations as irrelevant, flawed, or unnecessary, and calling FC an "effective and legitimate intervention". As of 2014, the facilitated communication movement remained popular and it continued to be used in many countries. Mostert writes:

All the newer pro-FC studies operate from the premise that FC works and is a legitimate practice to be used in investigating any number of other phenomena related to people with autism and other related severe communication problems. Such assumptions increasingly morph FC into a valid intervention among readers who are unaware of the empirical dismissal of the intervention and who might not be skilled in distinguishing solid from suspect research. In this regard, it is likely that FC will continue to reinforce the assumptions of efficacy among parents and practitioners. These perceptions will continue to be reinforced by professional organizations such as the Facilitated Communication Institute at Syracuse University, a fairly wide acceptance of FC internationally, and the vacuum created by few if any future solid empirical studies that are likely to dissuade the faithful.

Facilitated communication is closely related to the rapid prompting method (RPM), in which the facilitator holds the letter board instead of touching the patient. Proponents of RPM deny similarities with FC and state that the prompts are "nonspecific". However, RPM contains subtle cuing that makes it highly susceptible to influence from the facilitator.

Other similarities between RPM and FC include: reluctance or refusal to test their claims in controlled settings (purportedly because the process breaks the trust between facilitator and client), presumed competence, reliance on anecdotal accounts as proof of efficacy, maintenance of practices, techniques and claims that are inconsistent with the known research, claims of extraordinary literacy or intellectual breakthroughs, unconscious verbal or physical cuing by facilitators to obtain the expected responses, and inadequate or non-existent protocols to account for the effects of the facilitator.

Rapid Prompting Method has been rebranded as Spelling to Communicate (S2C) and Spellers Method.

In 2019, a dispute about the use of Spelling to Communicate (S2C) developed between the Lower Merion School District and the parent of a child attending school there. The parents claimed the child was deprived of a free education because the district declined to pay for a private educational program based on S2C. In December of that year, the hearing officer in the Pennsylvania Office of Dispute Resolution found that there was no evidence that S2C enabled the child to communicate and thus the school district prevailed.

== Organizations supporting and opposing facilitated communication ==
=== Supporters ===
In 2010, Autism Spectrum Disorders: A Reference Handbook mentioned the Autism National Committee (AutCom), a parent-led nonprofit, as the main example of an organization that continued promoting facilitated communication, despite research in the mid-1990s which found that facilitators were doing the communicating rather than the children themselves. As of 2022, AutCom continues to state on its website that it "[stands] with autistics, along with their families, friends, and allies, and others who know and respect them, who are working to gain a reliable, autonomous voice", and lists methods it supports including "Facilitated Communication Training (FCT), Rapid Prompting Method (RPM), Spelling to Communicate (S2C), or Informative Pointing Method". Other organizations supporting FC have included the Association for Persons with Severe Handicaps (TASH) and the Autistic Self-Advocacy Network (ASAN).

=== Opponents ===
Organizations opposing facilitated communication include:

- The American Academy of Child and Adolescent Psychiatry (AACAP)
- The American Academy of Pediatrics (AAP)
- The American Association on Intellectual and Developmental Disabilities (AAIDD), previously called the American Association on Mental Retardation (AAMR)
- The American Psychiatric Association (APA)
- The American Psychological Association (APA)
- The American Speech-Language-Hearing Association (ASHA)
- The Association for Behavior Analysis International (ABAI)
- The Association for Science in Autism Treatment
- The Federal Trade Commission (FTC)
- Deutsche Gesellschaft für Kinder- und Jugendpsychiatrie, Psychosomatik und Psychotherapie (German Society for Child and Adolescent Psychiatry, Psychosomatics, and Psychotherapy)
- Heilpädagogische Forschung
- The Institute on Disability (IOD) at the University of New Hampshire
- The University of Northern Iowa
- The International Society for Augmentative and Alternative Communication (ISAAC)
- The National Council on Severe Autism (NCAP)
- National Institute for Health and Care Excellence (NICE)
- The New York State Department of Health
- The New Zealand Ministries of Health and Education
- The Scottish Intercollegiate Guidelines Network
- Socialstyrelsen (The National Board of Health and Welfare, Sweden)
- Speech-Language and Audiology Canada (SAC)
- Speech Pathology Australia
- The Swedish Autism and Asperger Association
- The Victorian Advocacy League for Individuals and Disabilities Inc. (VALID)

== Claims and evidence ==
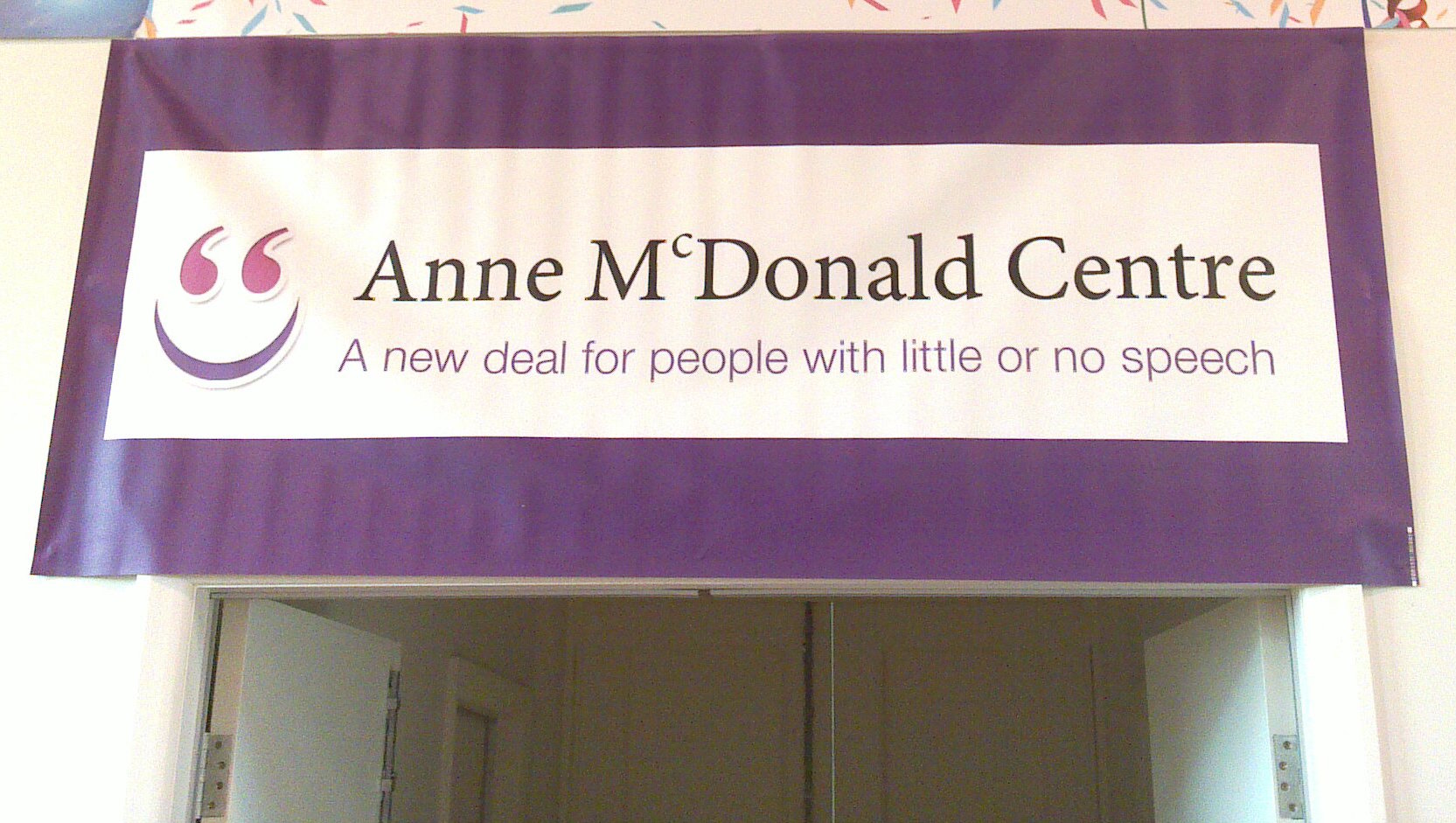
The Anne McDonald Centre, a facilitated communication centre in Melbourne, Australia, directed by Rosemary Crossley

There is widespread agreement within the scientific community and multiple disability advocacy organizations that FC is not a valid technique for communicating with those with autism spectrum disorder. Instead, research indicates that the facilitator is the source of the messages obtained through FC (involving ideomotor effect guidance of the arm of the patient by the facilitator). Studies have consistently found that FC is unable to provide the correct response to even simple questions when the facilitator does not know the answers to the questions (e.g., showing the patient but not the facilitator an object).

While videotapes exist that appear to show disabled people communicating through FC, or who have used it as a means to learn independent typing, these videos are widely regarded as inaccurate and misleading. According to Gina Green, a former president of the Association for Behavior Analysis International, says "You can edit videotape and show whatever you want. They'll show you a close-up of the finger moving across the keyboard... but you're not getting what else is going on."

=== Authorship of messages ===
Researchers attribute the facilitators' beliefs about authorship to the ideomotor effect (also called the Clever Hans or Ouija effect). While proponents say that FC should never involve guiding the patient, researchers attending an FC class in 1993 observed that physical force was used to prevent the patients from moving their hand away from the keyboard. Facilitators may also influence movements without realizing it. Researcher Gina Green stated: "Very subtle influence can affect people's behavior. It doesn't even have to be touched. It can be the slightest sound, the slightest visual cue." Guidelines for facilitators instruct practitioners to expect the emergence of hidden skills and sensitive personal information, to use anecdotal data to validate authorship, and to avoid objective scrutiny.

Some observers have reported that while the facilitators were watching the letter board, their communication partners were often distracted, staring off into space, rolling around on the floor, falling asleep, or otherwise not paying attention. In other cases, the communication partners spoke words that conflicted with the words being typed. Individuals described as highly competent would also give wrong answers to simple questions or information that they should have readily known (e.g. the name of the family dog, the names of family members, the spelling of their own name) but which facilitators did not.

Proponents of the technique believed that patients who had not been taught reading, writing, or mathematics could write down complex thoughts and solve multiplication problems. Patients have also been claimed to write books and poetry, advocate for better treatment of people with disabilities, express a desire to get married, have sexual relations, decide important medical issues, and, in some cases, report abuses allegedly occurring in their homes. According to psychologist Adrienne Perry, "The adult or child with autism is made a 'screen' for a facilitator's hostilities, hopes, beliefs or suspicions".

=== Autism ===
While proponents of FC claim that autism is primarily a motor control problem that can be overcome with physical support, this view is not accepted by the scientific community. Autism is often accompanied by intellectual disabilities affecting language and communication which cannot be overcome by supportively holding someone's hand. Facilitators reject objective data and use public opinion and qualitative studies to promote FC's efficacy despite contradicting a long history of autism research. In some cases, patients learn to give specific responses to cues from the facilitator, such as in cases where the facilitator only touches their shoulder or does not touch the patient at all. Proponents also say that a few individuals using FC have developed the ability to type independently or with minimal support, but these claims are anecdotal and have not been substantiated. Many facilitators deny they are influencing their communication partners' movements, even when faced with evidence to the contrary.

According to the American Academy of Pediatrics (AAP) clinical report, Identification, Evaluation, and Management of Children With Autism Spectrum Disorder, published in January, 2020, the "Current scientific evidence does not support the use of facilitated communication in which a nonverbal individual is guided to communicate. This differs from augmentative and alternative communication, in which the individual is taught to communicate independently."

Belief in facilitated communication is promoted by its status as a claimed "miracle cure" presented when parents are undergoing stress and grief from learning that their child has a disability. The only evidence of success is the transcript of apparent communication. In some cases of autism, parents reject the diagnosis and say that their child's disability is physical rather than developmental, and with FC or RPM, their beliefs are confirmed. Researchers James Mulick, John Jacobson and Frank Kobe state that FC is used to "...stroke their hopes with empty promises, regardless of their sincerity, while reaping personal or political rewards and working hard to prevent systematic verification of their claims". They add that "people with handicaps can be valued members of their families and communities without resorting to appeals to miracle cures" and that genuine help is available, but "advances in treatment and understanding come at the price of rigorous training, dedication to accuracy and scientific standards, and objective verification of all treatment claims".

Bernard Rimland, a research psychologist who founded the Autism Research Institute of San Diego and the Autism Society of America, asked "How is it possible that an autistic kid can pick up the last tiny crumbs of potato chips off a plate but not have sufficient motor coordination to type the letter E?" Howard Shane, director of the Center for Communication Enhancement at Children's Hospital in Boston and an associate professor at Harvard Medical School, finds it "curious that those being facilitated can only create [these] insightful comments" when helped by an assistant. Why, when technology allowed people with severe disabilities the opportunity to access independent communication with even the slightest movement (e.g., an eye wink, movement of an eyebrow, a puff of air into a straw), would a facilitator need to hold their hand?

Testifying in the Anna Stubblefield court case, psychology professor James Todd called facilitated communication "the single most scientifically discredited intervention in all of developmental disabilities" and that every methodologically sound study of FC has shown it to be invalid. Writing about that case in the journal "Disability and Society", Mark Sherry voiced similar concerns about FC's lack of scientific validity, calling it a "sham", "hoax" and a "fraud." Sherry's was the first article published in a Disability Studies journal which thoroughly critiqued Stubblefield's actions, a noteworthy contribution because Stubblefield had also been in Disability Studies and had previously published about FC in the journal Disability Studies Quarterly. Sherry suggested that some of the defenders of Stubblefield (and FC more broadly) are either her personal friends or work in institutions which receive substantial income from providing FC. A newspaper editorial from Syracuse University, where the techniques relevant to the case had been taught, called it "inexcusable" and "embarrassing" that the university continues to support FC after over 25 years of research has discredited it.

=== Opposition to research ===
Members of the FC movement rely on anecdotal and observational data (e.g., the existence of unique spellings or unexpected skills or revelations made during the communication session) in order to back up their claims. However, because cueing is often subtle and it is not always possible to observe the influence of the facilitator, informal observations and facilitator reports have proven unreliable in determining authorship.

Parents and researchers who questioned FC's effectiveness and supported evaluating FC by objective methods have been accused of being "oppressors of the disabled", told they were narrow-minded, outmoded, evil, jealous they were not the ones to discover FC, and, in some cases, accused of hate speech for advocating a more studied approach. Proponents claim that testing is demeaning to the disabled person, that the testing environment creates performance anxiety, or that those being facilitated may purposely produce nonsense, refuse to respond, or give wrong answers to counteract the negative attitudes of those who are skeptical of the technique.

Mostert wrote in 2001, "FC proponents must be encouraged to subject their claims to further scientific verification, the claims of anecdotal evidence notwithstanding. If any small part of FC is ever to be found effective or even plausible, it is abundantly clear that only by careful use of controlled experimental methods will this be established." The only way to determine whether communications are truly independent is to perform controlled testing, where the facilitator does not already know the answers to questions and, therefore, cannot inadvertently or purposefully cue their communication partner to obtain the desired answer. Even if the facilitator feels like they are not moving the other person's hand, they can still be providing cues that lead to specific letters on the keyboard.

In 1992, when FC was fairly new to the United States, Douglas Biklen was quoted in The Washington Post as saying he "welcomed scientific studies", but the article went on to say:

he doesn't want to do them. He's an educator, not a psychiatrist, and like other educators who have written about facilitated communication, he is comfortable with the fact that there is often a lag time between the application of a new method and its scientific validation.

Although proponents say that FC is difficult or impossible to objectively test, psychologist James T. Todd wrote:

the determination of authorship in FC involves a straightforward application of basic experimental methods described comprehensively by Mill (1843) more than a century and half ago, but understood for millennia. We are not speaking of obscure or controversial techniques. We are speaking of authorship validation by selectively presenting different information to two people, then observing what is produced.

=== Blind testing ===
Despite the FC community's reluctance to participate in testing, researchers outside the community set up blinded experiments to identify who was doing the communicating. Some of the tests were conducted as a direct response to cases involving sexual abuse allegations made through facilitated communication against parents, teachers, and caregivers of people with disabilities. However, several controlled evaluations were also conducted by clinicians, researchers, and program administrators who were considering the use of FC, but wanted an objective, empirical basis for deciding what role, if any, FC would have in their programs.

The O.D. Heck Center in Schenectady, New York, was one of the first in the United States to go public with their findings, which were that their clients produced meaningful responses through facilitated communication only when their facilitators had access to the correct responses. The report also ruled out issues of confidence or skepticism on the part of the evaluators. All twelve participants (people with disabilities) were chosen for the evaluation because their facilitators believed in their ability to communicate through FC. The study demonstrated that the communication partners were "systematically and unknowingly" being influenced by their facilitators. The researchers wrote:

In fact, the nature of the findings permits us to assert that their output in facilitated communication was not only influenced, but was controlled and determined by the facilitators. To all appearances, these participants had been producing thoughtful communication, and several had consistently engaged in interactive conversations using facilitated communication. Many people serving these individuals believed that this output reflected the valid expressions of the participants.

The result of the O.D. Heck study seemed so startling, especially in light of the positive response FC was getting in the popular press, that Frontline featured the story in its 1993 "Prisoners of Silence". In 1993, Genae A. Hall, research director for the Behavior Analysis Center for Autism, wrote:

The fact that facilitators often control and direct the typing has been called "facilitator influence," which seems to be a misnomer. "Facilitator influence" suggests that the disabled person is emitting verbal behavior, and the facilitator is exerting partial control (or "influence") over that behavior. Although partial control certainly may occur when fading prompts within structured teaching programs, such control has not been demonstrated in most cases of FC. Rather than influencing the typed messages, the facilitator appears to be the sole author of those messages. Thus, the focus of analysis is shifted from the disabled person's behavior to the facilitator's behavior.

Multiple other double-blind studies were being conducted at the same time, and whenever conditions were adequately controlled to prevent the facilitator from knowing the answers to questions, the results revealed facilitator influence, if not direct authorship.

In 1994, Thistledown Regional Centre in Ontario, Canada, conducted an internal study of 20 people with autism and stopped using FC when the results showed facilitator influence was "contaminating the messages being produced." By 1995, these results had been replicated by researchers worldwide in at least 24 studies in credible, peer-reviewed research journals using multiple different methods that ensure the facilitator does not know or cannot guess the expected message, or does not look at the letters.

In 1997, reflecting on the trajectory FC has taken in several countries, including Denmark, the U.S., and Australia, von Tetzchner wrote:

In the struggle to keep up to date with an increasing number of published papers, both researchers and practitioners tend to forget history. To avoid making the same mistakes, the issues and processes underlying the rise and fall of facilitating techniques--as well as other intervention methods--in various countries should have a natural place in research reviews. When an intervention claimed to have exceptional effects disappears, the likely reason is a lack of positive results.

By 2005, more than 50 controlled studies and blind tests had been conducted, in addition to numerous controlled tests conducted in legal cases. The studies consistently showed "without a doubt" that the messages obtained through facilitated communication were controlled by the facilitators and not their communication partners.

The vast majority of evidence now indicates that facilitated communication is not scientifically valid. However, this information has not stopped many individuals from using this technique under various circumstances and advocating for its effectiveness. The overwhelming majority of studies conducted on the efficacy of this technique has revealed that any "positive" results indicating that facilitated communication has worked can be attributed to the facilitators themselves. Be it the facilitator attributing their own beliefs and views onto the individual, or creating a pseudo-personality for the disabled individual based on their previous encounters with them, it is clear that the facilitator is the one doing all the communicating.

The American Psychological Association (APA) issued a statement in 1994 that there was "no scientifically demonstrated support for its efficacy." Finally, even further defining facilitated communication as a pseudoscience, the APA issued a statement indicating that facilitated communication studies have repeatedly demonstrated that it is not a scientifically valid technique and that it is a controversial and unproved communicative procedure with no scientifically demonstrated support for its efficacy.

== Previous proponents ==
Pat Mirenda, a professor in the Department of Educational and Counseling Psychology and Special Education at the University of British Columbia, and co-author David R. Beukelman, Barkley Professor of Communication Disorders at the University of Nebraska-Lincoln, had included FC in early versions of their textbook Augmentative and Alternative Communication: Supporting Children and Adults with Complex Communication Needs. These versions are quoted in pro-FC literature. However, they decided not to include FC in revised versions, and in 2015 Mirenda stated that she, "came to recognize (painfully, to be honest) that my advocacy stance biased me to interpret what I saw on videotapes as independent typing even though other explanations were more plausible (e.g., subtle prompting, resulting in an ideomotor effect), and that, even if independent typing did occur subsequent to FC exposure, only correlational—but definitely not causal—evidence exists with regard to its relationship to FC. In short, I do not endorse FC as a communication or instructional technique, and I do not support its use."

Stephen N. Calculator of the University of New Hampshire, an early proponent of FC, later distanced himself from the movement because he could not replicate claims of independent communication in his own research studies. He described the importance of determining the extent of facilitator influence: "The consequences of falsely attributing messages to communicators, rather than facilitators, continue to have significant financial, social and moral ramifications. Facilitators must take extraordinary precautions to ensure that they are not unduly influencing messages and thereby impinging on communicators' freedom of speech. The rights of individuals to express their thoughts and ideas should not be circumvented by facilitators who communicate for them, unwilling or not."

Janyce Boynton, who was once a strong FC proponent, is now one of FC's leading critics. In the early 1990s, she was the facilitator for a non-speaking high school girl with autism who seemed to describe having been sexually abused by her parents, resulting in the girl and her brother being removed from their home. However, systematic testing by Howard Shane revealed that the girl could not have been the author of the messages. The case was described in the 1993 PBS Frontline documentary "Prisoners of Silence". Unlike many in the FC-proponent community, Boynton accepted the evidence from Shane's testing and other well-controlled scientific studies. She stopped using FC, convinced her school administration to implement a system-wide prohibition on its use, and apologized to the falsely accused parents of the girl she had worked with. In a presentation at the CSICON meetings in 2019, Boynton argued that most FC facilitators are well-meaning but are caught up in a belief system that leads them to discount the overwhelming evidence that FC does not work. She maintains a clearinghouse of professional articles and media coverage about FC, and helped in convincing the University of Northern Iowa to stop sponsoring an annual workshop that included instruction in FC. As stated by another member of that group (Stuart Vyse), "this is just the beginning. There are a number of other universities and governmental organizations that tacitly or explicitly endorse FC and/or its related techniques, and Ms. Boynton and her allies have their eyes on a number of these future targets".

In 2006, Belgian neurologist Steven Laureys claimed that Rom Houben, a comatose man, was able to type out thoughts on a keypad with the help of facilitated communications. However, when independent tests demonstrated that FC could not produce the correct answers to questions if the facilitator had not been in the room, he agreed that Houben had not been communicating.

== Presentation in the media ==
Stories of purported successes are still reported in magazines such as Reader's Digest, in movies and plays, and on television shows such as ABC's 20/20 Prime Time Live with Diane Sawyer. Thousands of people—teachers, parents, speech pathologists, psychologists—struggling to find a way to communicate with individuals who, otherwise, demonstrated little ability to use words to communicate—adopted FC with "blinding speed" with little public scrutiny or debate. Eric Schopler, then director of an autism education program at the University of North Carolina, Chapel Hill and editor of the Journal of Autism, described promoting facilitated communication with no empirical evidence as "reckless".

Describing this rapid rise in popularity, particularly in the United States, doctors John W. Jacobson, James A. Mulick, and Allen A. Schwartz wrote:

The general acceptance of FC by the public and segments of the professional community has called into question the rigor with which educational and therapeutic interventions are evaluated in publicly funded programs and the ability of many professionals to critically assess the procedures they use. As such, FC serves as a case study in how the public and, alarmingly, some professionals, fail to recognize the role of science in distinguishing truth from falsity and its applicability to assessing the value of treatment modalities.

James Randi, a magician familiar with the ideomotor effect commonly attributed to dowsing and later linked to FC, was called in to investigate facilitated communication at the University of Wisconsin at Madison in 1992, and later called it "a crock that does more harm than good by raising false hopes among families of autistic children". The James Randi Educational Foundation has offered a million-dollar prize "to a valid demonstration of facilitated communication." In 2009, Randi responded in an interview for the Rom Houben case, where it was shown that messages from a Belgian man who was believed to be in a coma for 23 years were generated by the facilitator, "Our prize is still there."

== Institutional support ==
=== Syracuse University ===
In 1992, Syracuse University founded the Facilitated Communication Institute to promote the use of FC. Douglas Biklen was appointed as the institute's first director. In 2010, the name was changed to the Institute on Communication and Inclusion (ICI). It is part of the Center on Disability and Inclusion of the School of Education. According to the ICI website, the Institute "... is an active research, training, and support center, and the nation's leading resource for information about communication and inclusion for individuals who type to communicate." The Institute carries out training and research in FC and publishes scholarly articles, books, and films.

=== University of Northern Iowa ===
From 2014 through 2018, the University of Northern Iowa (UNI) held the Midwest Summer Institute that focused on "inclusive schools, employment and daily living, as well as communication and supported or facilitated typing for people with autism spectrum disabilit[ies] and other complex communication needs." In 2018, following the release of a statement from scientists and academics arguing FC had long been discredited and calling it an "invalidated and demonstrably harmful practice", UNI announced it would stop supporting the conference.

== Abuse allegations and facilitator misconduct ==
There have been instances in which facilitated communication produces allegations of sexual or physical abuse. Often, the alleged abuse is sexual and contains "extensive, explicit, pornographic details." It is not known whether FC generates more abuse allegations than other suggestive techniques.

Researchers suspect that facilitators involved in this type of case may, mistakenly, believe there is a link between early abuse and autism, or suspect familial abuse for other reasons. As Green wrote in a 1995 article:

suggestions about sexual abuse permeate the culture. Just watch Oprah or Phil [Donahue] almost any time or scan the pop psychology section at your local bookstore. Couple that with mandatory abuse reporting laws, mix in a little bit of crusading zeal to "save" people with disabilities from mistreatment, and you have a potent set of antecedents for facilitators to produce allegations.

In 1993, Frontline's "Prisoners of Silence" featured the story of Gerry Gherardi of North Carolina, who was accused, through FC-generated messages, of sexually abusing his son. Despite protestations of innocence, Gherardi was forced to stay away from his home for six months. The charges were dropped when court-ordered double-blind tests showed that Gherardi's son could not write. In the same year, Rimland reported in a New York Times article that he knew of about 25 cases where families were accused through facilitated communication of sexually abusing their children.

By 1995, there were 60 known cases, with many others settled without reaching public visibility. Since then, the number of cases continues to increase. In addition to accusations of sexual abuse, facilitators have reportedly fallen in love with their communication partners and, relying on FC for consent, initiated sexual, physical contact with people in their care, raising serious ethical and legal problems.

=== Anna Stubblefield ===
In 2015, Anna Stubblefield, a Rutgers University–Newark philosophy professor, was found guilty of aggravated sexual assault against a man with severe mental disabilities. A proponent of facilitated communication, Stubblefield's website described her as "certified as a Facilitated Communication Trainer by the FC Institute at the School of Education, Syracuse University. She provides motor planning support for communication and literacy for adults and children." At the time the investigation began in 2011, Stubblefield was the chair of Rutgers-Newark's philosophy department, whose professional work centered on ethics, race, and disability rights, but she was subsequently put on administrative leave without pay and removed as chair of the philosophy department.

The victim was identified as D.J., a 33-year-old African-American man with severe mental disabilities who cannot speak, has cerebral palsy, and is unable to stand independently or accurately direct movements of his body. Based on his disability, his mother and brother were appointed his legal guardians. Stubblefield stated that she had successfully communicated with him, determining he was of normal intelligence. She subsequently brought him to conferences where she "held him out as a success story". In 2011, she revealed to his mother and brother that she had had sexual relations with D.J. and said that they were in love, attributing consent to messages received while facilitating. Stubblefield stated that the two of them had a mutually consenting relationship established through facilitated communication. However, testing of D.J. by family members failed to establish the ability to communicate, and Stubblefield was thanked but denied further access to D.J. She continued to attempt to maintain contact with D.J. and began challenging control of D.J.'s legal guardians over him. In August 2011, the family contacted the police.

Stubblefield pleaded not guilty to the charges and said that FC revealed D.J. was mentally capable, while prosecutors said that FC was scientifically discredited and that D.J. did not have the ability to consent to sexual relations. Experts evaluating D.J. testified he did not have the intellectual ability to consent to sexual activity. Facilitated communication testimony from D.J. was not allowed as the technique was ruled unreliable under New Jersey law. After a three-week trial, the jury found Stubblefield guilty of two counts of first-degree aggravated sexual assault. After conviction, the judge revoked bail, saying that she was a flight risk, and she was sentenced to 12 years in prison. This included requiring her to register as a sex offender. In July 2017, an appeals court overturned her conviction and ordered a retrial, and in 2018 she pleaded guilty to "third-degree aggravated criminal sexual contact" and was sentenced to time served. In October 2016, the family was awarded $4 million in a civil lawsuit against Stubblefield.

The 2023 documentary film Tell Them You Love Me covers the story.

=== Martina Susanne Schweiger case ===
In 2014, Martina Susanne Schweiger of Queensland, Australia, received an 18-month suspended jail sentence for two counts of indecent dealing with a 21-year-old client with severe autism with whom she worked at a disability services home. The client required 24-hour support and could not speak, write, or use manual sign language.

Schweiger believed the client expressed love for her through FC, which she claimed to reciprocate. She also believed the client, again through FC, indicated a desire to have sex. On one occasion, Schweiger removed her clothes in front of her client. On another, she "play wrestled" with him, touching his penis with her hands and mouth. She confessed her actions to her employer. After hearing reports from Alan Hudson, psychology professor at RMIT University, that FC "did not work for the young man", Judge Gary Long of Maroochydore District Court found Schweiger guilty of the charges, indicating that FC was neither reliable nor accurate as a method of communication.

== See also ==
- Augmentative and alternative communication
- Rapid prompting method
- The Telepathy Tapes

Films

- Annie's Coming Out – based on the case of Anne McDonald
- Autism Is a World
- Deej
- Wretches & Jabberers
