= Rosemary Crossley =

Australian advocate for facilitated communication (1945–2023)

Rosemary Crossley AM
- Born: 6 May 1945; Horsham, Victoria, Australia
- Died: 10 May 2023 (aged 78)
- Known for: Facilitated communication
- Notable work: Annie's Coming Out

Rosemary Crossley AM (6 May 1945 – 10 May 2023) was an Australian author and advocate for disability rights, whose legacy was highly controversial. She was one of the first major advocates for facilitated communication (FC), a scientifically discredited technique which purports to help non-verbal people communicate. Crossley was the director of the Anne McDonald Centre near Melbourne, Victoria, which provided assessment and augmentative communication services in-person until her death, when they moved online. The award-winning 1984 film Annie's Coming Out, known as Test of Love in the USA, was made about her work and life with a woman named Anne McDonald, whom she met at St Nicholas's Hospital in Melbourne in the 1970s and later brought to live with her. Crossley died from cancer on 10 May 2023, at the age of 78.

== Advocacy controversies ==
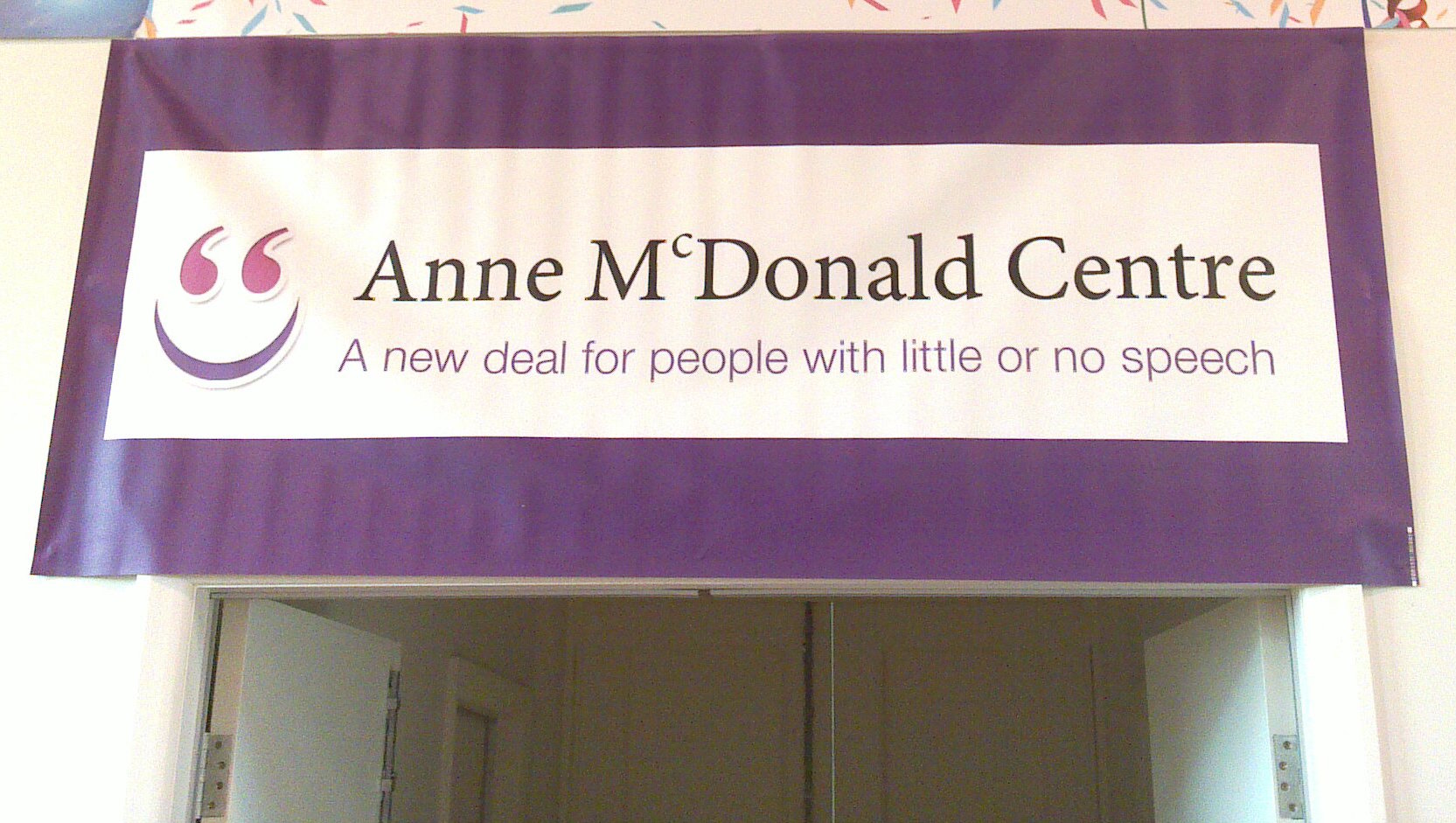
The Anne McDonald Centre, a centre for FC use in Melbourne directed by Crossley.

In 1975, Crossley was working at St. Nicholas Hospital, Carlton, Victoria, which was run by the Mental Health Authority and housed children with intellectual disabilities. Concerned that the hospital schedule accommodated inflexible staffing arrangements, rather than the needs of the children, Crossley made a submission to a Victorian committee on mental retardation. She also raised questions with the Mental Health Authority about some of the children in the hospital, claiming that although they had severe physical disabilities, they were not intellectually disabled.

Crossley was appointed a Member of the Order of Australia (AM) in the 1986 Queen's Birthday Honours, for her services to people with severe communication impairment. However, many experienced speech therapy professionals said that Crossley was manipulating the hands of her clients, and the thoughts that were written were those of Crossley herself.

Crossley established the DEAL (Dignity, Education, Advocacy, Language) Communication Centre, which was later renamed the Anne McDonald Centre. The centre used to provide in-person assessment and augmentative communication services in Victoria, Australia. After Crossley passed away, they moved all their services online. Douglas Biklen of Syracuse University, Division of Special Education and Rehabilitation, visited her in Australia, and went on to popularise facilitated communication in the US.

In 2012, journalist Andrew Rule published two articles in the Melbourne Herald Sun about Crossley, under the titles "Rosemary's Baby" and "True Crime". The latter asserted that Crossley falsely claimed facilitated communication was effective for McDonald, as McDonald did not have the capability to advocate for herself. The newspaper later published clarifications that they did not intend to convey the meaning that Crossley deliberately misled people, nor that she was a criminal. They removed both articles from the newspaper's website.

Crossley claimed in the 1993 Frontline documentary "Prisoners of Silence" that a comatose man that she was working with could pick his own housing arrangement, but Frontline disproved this claim, using digital overlays.

Crossley defended Anna Stubblefield against charges that she had sexually assaulted a man with severe cerebral palsy, identified as D.J., by claiming that he could answer yes/no questions independently. Sociologist Mark Sherry said that Stubblefield manufactured D.J.'s communications. Stubblefield's conviction was later overturned, with the judge ordering a retrial.

In 2018, Stubblefield pleaded guilty to "third-degree aggravated criminal sexual contact" and was sentenced to time served.

=== Court cases ===
Crossley was involved in multiple court cases concerning false abuse allegations made through facilitated communication. One involved the termination of an employee, and the other one involved forced removal of an intellectually disabled woman named Gina from her home. One of the clients consented to a hysterectomy through facilitated communication.

Crossley had attempted to go on trips with Leonie McFarlane, another individual who has cerebral palsy and is nonverbal, to a conference about disability in another state, but her application to the Supreme Court was not successful. McFarlane's parents opposed the request because they said that she could not communicate independently. Crossley had previously been banned from seeing McFarlane in 1980 at St Nicholas Hospital, but after the closure of the hospital, McFarlane had often gone on outings with Crossley and McDonald.

Crossley also attempted to also give a woman named Angela Wallace the legal right to leave the institution she was at by using facilitated communication. However, based on an investigation by Peter Eisen, it was determined that Wallace would not have the ability to give consent. Additionally, it was found that Crossley helped create a false accusation of sexual assault through "Carla", who was purported to have claimed through FC that her father was abusing her.

== Authorship controversy ==
Crossley is a co-author of Annie's Coming Out, a story about a girl named Anne McDonald whom Crossley claimed had learned to communicate through facilitated communication. McDonald's story went on to be made into a film titled Annie's Coming Out (also called A Test Of Love) in 1984 starring Angela Punch McGregor and directed by Gil Brealey. The screenplay for the film was written by Crossley's partner, Chris Borthwick, with both Crossley and McDonald credited as contributing writers. The film won Australian Film Institute (AFI) awards for Best Picture, Best Actress, Best Supporting Actress, and Best Adapted Screenplay.

McDonald was born on 11 January 1961 in Seymour, Victoria, Australia. As a result of a birth injury, she developed severe athetoid cerebral palsy. Because she could not walk, talk or feed herself, she was diagnosed as having severe intellectual disability. At the age of three, she was placed by her parents in St. Nicholas Hospital, Melbourne, a Health Commission (government) institution for children with severe disabilities, and she lived there without education or therapy for eleven years. During McDonald's time in the hospital she was neglected and starved, and in a later court case the Health Commission conceded that at age 16 she weighed only 12 kilograms. In 1977, when McDonald was 16, Crossley reported that she was able to communicate with her by supporting her upper arm while she selected word blocks and magnetic letters. Crossley continued using similar strategies with McDonald and other individuals with disabilities, developing what has become known as facilitated communication training.

Through Crossley, McDonald appeared to seek discharge from St. Nicholas. Her parents and the hospital authorities denied her request on the grounds that the reality of her communication had not been established. In 1979, when McDonald turned eighteen, a habeas corpus action in the Supreme Court of Victoria was commenced against the Health Commission in order to win the right to leave the institution. The court accepted that McDonald's communication was her own and allowed her to leave the hospital and live with Crossley.

After leaving the institution, McDonald got a Higher School Certificate (University entrance) qualification from a night school and went on to receive a humanities degree from Deakin University in 1993. On the International Day of Persons with Disabilities, 3 December 2008, McDonald received the Personal Achievement Award in the Australian National Disability Awards. McDonald died of a heart attack on 22 October 2010, aged 49. She received a posthumous award from the Australian Group on Severe Communication Impairment (AGOSCI).

Annie's Coming Out depicts Crossley account of developing facilitated communication. Widespread controversy has continued to accompany its use in the autistic population, with a number of peer reviewed scientific studies have concluded that the language output attributed to the clients is directed or systematically determined by the therapists who provide facilitated assistance. Some have questioned whether McDonald was actually communicating through Crossley.

Crossley later wrote Speechless: Facilitating Communication for People Without Voices about the experiences of several people who she considered to have first acquired communication through this technique. She was the Keynote Conference Speaker at the International Association of Severe Disabilities in 1990.

== Bibliography ==
- The Dole Cookbook (Collingwood: Outback, 1978), ISBN 0-86888-219-4
- Annie's Coming Out (Penguin Books, 1980), ISBN 0-14-005688-2
- Facilitated Communication Training (Teachers College Press, 1994), ISBN 0-8077-3327-X
- Speechless: Facilitating Communication for People Without Voices (1997), ISBN 0-525-94156-8
