= Anne McDonald =

Australian subject of facilitated communication

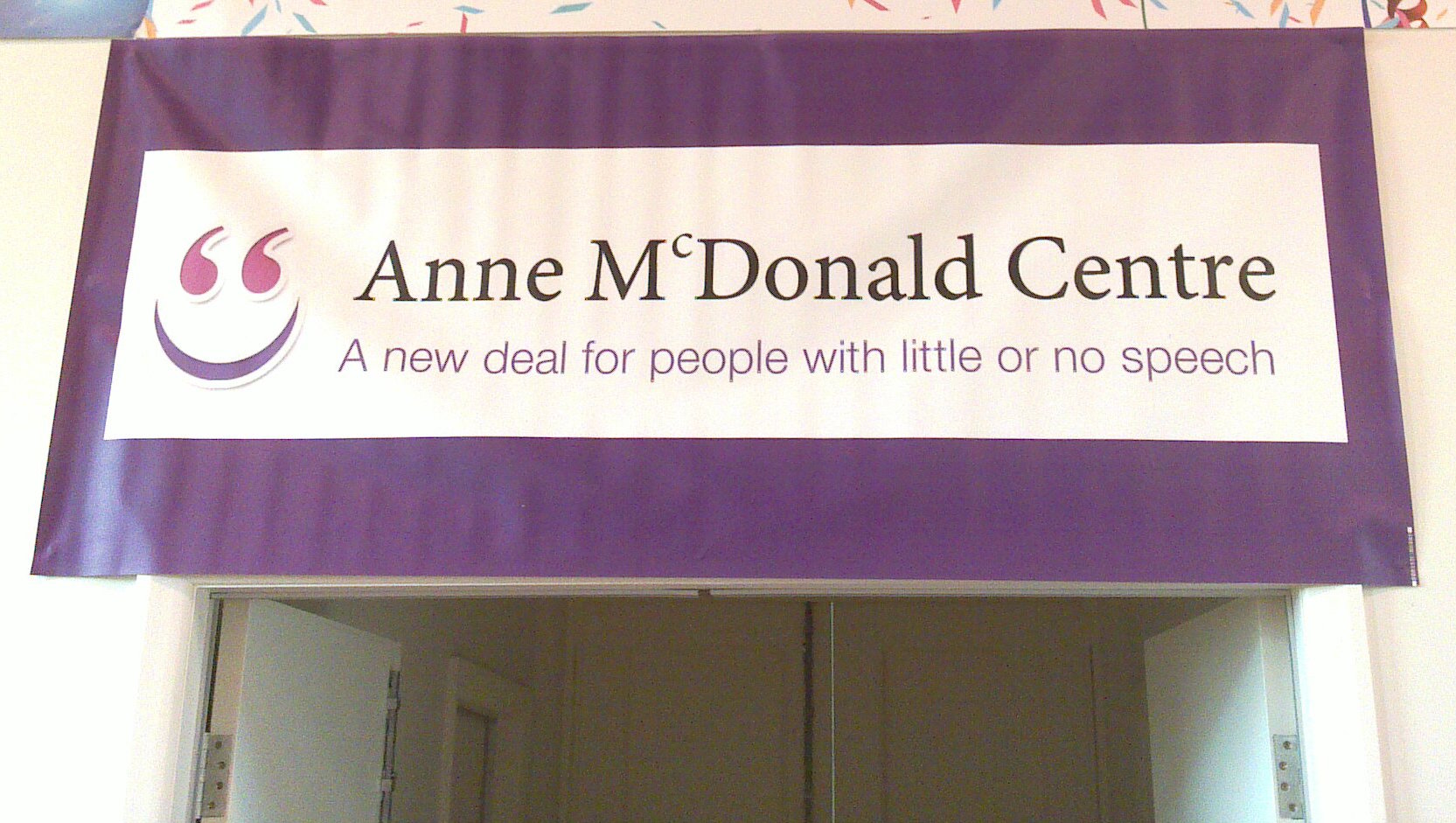
The Anne McDonald Centre, a centre for facilitated communication use in Melbourne directed by Rosemary Crossley.

Anne McDonald (11 January 1961 – 22 October 2010) was a nonverbal Australian woman with cerebral palsy and severe intellectual disability who was one of the first subjects of the scientifically discredited facilitated communication (FC) technique. McDonald was credited as an author and activist despite not having a legitimate means of communication. The Anne McDonald Centre, which promotes the use of facilitated communication, is named after her.

== History ==
McDonald was born on 11 January 1961 in Seymour, Victoria. As a result of a birth injury, she developed athetoid cerebral palsy and severe intellectual disability. She could not walk, talk or feed herself. At the age of three, she was placed by her parents in St. Nicholas Hospital, Melbourne, a Health Commission (government) institution for children with severe disabilities. At age 16 she weighed 12 kilograms (26 pounds). Her brother Ewan remembers visiting his sister often on Sundays, the family taking her for outings and buying her treats. His recollections may be mistaken: a contemporary news report stated that in 1975 she had not left the hospital in 11 years: "Anne McDonald, a 14-year-old girl... will leave hospital for the first time in 11 years tomorrow – because of the strike by psychiatric nurses. Anne's father, Angus McDonald, of Seymour, said... "We were told before that it would be distressing for her to leave the hospital environment.""

In 1977, when McDonald was 16, Rosemary Crossley claimed that she was able to communicate with her by supporting her upper arm while she selected word blocks and magnetic letters. Within two weeks with Crossley supporting McDonald's arm to point at things, McDonald spelled out a sentence. A month later McDonald showed she was familiar with local politics, in the next month McDonald did fractions. Crossley continued using similar strategies with McDonald and other individuals with disabilities, developing what has become known as facilitated communication training. Some of Crossley's co-workers suspected that Crossley was moving McDonald's hand and actually the one communicating, something that Crossley herself suspected she might be doing, "'making up sentences to fit what were really random twitchings.'" Crossley speculated that McDonald learned language from watching television and overhearing conversations, learning "arithmetic by counting slats on the barriers that enclosed her cot." Prior to Crossley's involvement McDonald spent her days "writhing on the floor" or in her cot; she received no education of any kind.

Through Crossley, McDonald appeared to seek discharge from St. Nicholas Hospital. Her parents and the hospital authorities denied her request on the grounds that the reality of her communication had not been established. In 1979, when McDonald turned eighteen, a habeas corpus action in the Supreme Court of Victoria was commenced against the Health Commission in order to win the right to leave the institution. The court accepted that McDonald's communication was her own and allowed her to leave the hospital and live with Crossley.

Patricia Margaret Minnes, then senior clinical psychologist, Mental Retardation Services of the Health Commission of Victoria, who was present during the psychological testing of McDonald, objected with the following statement:

However in my opinion the results of this assessment cannot be considered objectively reliable and valid until such time as Anne is shown to perform at a similar intellectual level under experimentally controlled conditions. In my view there are at least three variables which need to be controlled, namely – (a) the nature of support to Anne's arm, (b) the amount of information available to the supporting person regarding the response requested of Anne, and (c) the nature of Anne's responses. In my opinion these factors can be controlled and until the assessment is made under objectively reliable experimental conditions in my opinion the results of Mr. Healey's assessment cannot be taken as conclusive.

Despite her inability to communicate, McDonald was given a Higher School Certificate (University entrance) qualification from a night school and was awarded a humanities degree from Deakin University for coursework completed through facilitated communication. She was also credited as a co-author of the book Annie's Coming Out (1980), which won the inaugural Allen Lane Award for the best book of the year dealing with disability. The film Annie's Coming Out, based on the book, won several Australian Film Institute awards (including Best Picture) and was released in the US under the title Test of Love. On the International Day of Persons with Disabilities, 3 December 2008, McDonald received the Personal Achievement Award in the Australian National Disability Awards at Parliament House.

In 2012 McDonald's mother Bev McDonald stated that she was happy that her daughter had gained weight under the care of "state-paid carers that Crossley organised" but quickly realized that the claims that she was communicating independently were "hollow"; in various tries to get her daughter to use the letter board, she could only do so when her arm was guided. On one occasion McDonald's mother gently held her elbow to type out something very rude about Crossley while watching her daughter's face; she found no reaction. She gave her daughter messages to pass on to Crossley which did not get passed on. McDonald’s brother Ewen said that he tried to have conversations with his sister in the hopes that Crossley would mention them later during FC sessions; none were mentioned.

McDonald died of a heart attack on 22 October 2010, aged 49.

== Controversy ==
Accounts of McDonald's use of facilitated communication have been questioned as the technique has been proven invalid through scientific research. Psychologists and policy makers have argued facilitated communication is, at best, ineffective wishful thinking, and at worst, actively harmful. McDonald's website maintains that her communication was entirely her own, and that she found it unnecessary and inappropriate to debate the fact further as it had been proven beyond a reasonable doubt to the standards of the Supreme Court.

McDonald and her story have reappeared in the news following the sexual assault case against New Jersey facilitated communication aide Anna Stubblefield, who, in 2018, pleaded guilty to "third-degree aggravated criminal sexual contact" and was sentenced to time served. In October 2016, the victim's family was awarded $4 million in a civil lawsuit against Stubblefield.

== Related reading ==
- Annie's Coming Out (Penguin Books, 1980) ISBN 0-14-005688-2
