= Augmentative and Alternative Communication (journal) =

Scientific journal

- Subject: Augmentative and alternative communication
- Language: English
- Edited by: Ralf Schlosser

Publication details
- History: 1985–present
- Publisher: Taylor & Francis
- Frequency: Quarterly
- Impact factor: 2.706 (2018)

Standard abbreviations
- ISO 4: Augment. Altern. Commun.

Indexing
- ISSN: 0743-4618 (print); 1477-3848 (web)
- LCCN: 2008233950
- OCLC no.: 718212881

Links
- Journal homepage; Online access; Online archive

Augmentative and Alternative Communication is a quarterly peer-reviewed scientific journal covering augmentative and alternative communication. It was established in 1985 and is published by Taylor & Francis on behalf of the International Society for Augmentative and Alternative Communication, of which it is the official journal. The editor-in-chief is Ralf Schlosser (Northeastern University). According to the Journal Citation Reports, the journal has a 2018 impact factor of 2.706.
