= Rom Houben =

Belgian man involved in facilitated communication scandal

Rom Houben is a Belgian man believed to be comatose and in a vegetative state for 23 years after a near-fatal automobile accident, who was diagnosed with locked-in syndrome in 2006.

Caregivers claimed that Houben was able to use facilitated communication, a scientifically discredited technique, to communicate, a claim which was disputed by researchers evaluating him. Houben was diagnosed with total locked-in syndrome by Belgian neurologist Steven Laureys in 2006 with the help of modern brain imaging techniques and equipment. Following this, it was claimed that he could communicate by typing into a keyboard when his right hand was supported by a communication facilitator.

== Controversy ==
While Houben was diagnosed with locked-in syndrome in 2006, his case was first reported in a BMC Neurology paper in July 2009 without him being named. Houben was only brought to wider public attention after German weekly magazine Der Spiegel ran a story on him in November 2009, which was subsequently picked up by media outlets around the world.

The method used to allegedly communicate with Houben is known as "facilitated communication", which the Association for Behavior Analysis International, the American Academy of Child and Adolescent Psychiatry and the American Association on Intellectual and Developmental Disabilities have called a "discredited technique", the use of which is "unwarranted and unethical". Skeptics, including PZ Myers and James Randi, contend that facilitated communication does not involve actual communication with the disabled, but rather with the people playing the role of the "facilitator". Randi wrote that claims of Houben's facilitated communication amount to a "cruel farce." Neurologist Steven Novella argued that there was "little doubt" that Houben's typing was the result of bogus facilitated communication. Video footage showed the "facilitator", Linda Wouters, holding Houben's hand as his finger is being used to type at a rapid pace, while the subject appears to be slumped over with his eyes closed.

Additionally, Arthur Caplan, a bioethics professor at the University of Pennsylvania, has stated that the statements Houben allegedly made through his facilitator seemed unnatural for someone disabled and unable to speak for decades. Through Wouters, Houben is quoted as saying "Now I can communicate and talk via facilitated communication. Not everyone believes in this form of communication. It is a controversial method but, for me, it is vital to life. At last, my views can be heard and my feelings expressed."

Laureys stated that he had verified that the facilitated communication was genuine, by showing Houben objects when the facilitator was not present in the room, and later asking Houben to recall those objects. Novella suggested that Laureys had not used proper controls.

In an interview with the Belgian newspaper De Standaard, Laureys stated that he was not involved in the choice of communication method and refused to comment on its validity. He stated that he was "a skeptic [himself]" and that "the bad reputation of some forms [of facilitated communication] is justified". He also stated that Houben's case was only made public because Der Spiegel wanted to report on his study and was looking for a "human element" to the story: "I knew that Rom and his family were willing to collaborate because they had done so before [for a Flemish TV channel]." Laureys also criticized some of the negative feedback for "judging the evidence only on the basis of some video footage" and stated that "given time, we will look scientifically into the different ways of communication. For us, this seems to be the proper way."

Laureys later concluded that messages attributed to Houben through Wouters' facilitation were not coming from Houben. Using a different facilitator, fifteen objects which were shown to Houben over a period of weeks, and Houben was unable to communicate knowledge of any of the objects which had been shown to him during the facilitator's absence. Novella attributed Laureys' prior error to likely insufficient experience with facilitated communication.

== Philosophical perspectives ==
Houben's case has been used to question the current methods of diagnosing vegetative state and to arguments against withholding care from such patients. However, some bioethicists believe that the case, if confirmed, may provide stronger arguments for withdrawing or withholding from vegetative patients. Bioethicist Jacob M. Appel of New York University has suggested that the case may be either "a matter of wishful thinking", or "a cruel and manipulative hoax" that would be used by political conservatives in campaigns against the right to die.

== See also ==
- Clever Hans – 20th-century horse claimed to have been able to do mathematics
