= Annie's Coming Out =

Film that promotes a discredited communication technique

- Directed by: Gil Brealey
- Written by: Chris Borthwick; Rosemary Crossley; Anne McDonald; John Patterson
- Produced by: Don Murray
- Cinematography: Mick von Bornemann
- Edited by: Lindsay Frazer
- Music by: Simon Walker
- Production company: Film Australia
- Distributed by: Hoyts (Australia); Umbrella Entertainment; Universal (US)
- Release dates: 27 September 1984 (Australia); 23 November 1984 (UK); 29 March 1985 (US)
- Running time: 96 minutes
- Country: Australia
- Language: English
- Budget: under AU$1 million

Annie's Coming Out (released in the United States as A Test of Love) is a 1984 Australian drama film directed by Gil Brealey. It is based on the 1980 book Annie's Coming Out which was written by Rosemary Crossley, supposedly with the assistance of Anne McDonald. The book tells the story of McDonald's early life in a government institution for people with severe disabilities and her subsequent release, as well as her therapist's attempts to communicate with her through the discredited method of facilitated communication.

== Premise ==
Annie O'Farrell (based on Anne McDonald) is a 13-year-old girl with athetoid cerebral palsy who is unable to communicate and has been living in a government institution from an early age. Jessica Hathaway (based on Rosemary Crossley) is a therapist who learns to communicate with Annie using an alphabet board and comes to believe that although physically disabled, Annie is not intellectually impaired. When Annie turns 18, Jessica begins a legal fight to get her released.

== Cast ==
- Angela Punch McGregor as Jessica Hathaway
- Drew Forsythe as David Lewis
- Liddy Clark as Sally Clements
- Monica Maughan as Vera Peters
- Philippa Baker as Sister Waterman
- Tina Arhondis as Annie O'Farrell
- Mark Butler as Doctor John Monroe
- John Frawley as Harding
- Lyn Collingwood as Mrs O'Farrell
- Alastair Duncan as Hopgood
- Bud Tingwell as Judge
- Nikki Coghill as University girl
- Gia Carides as Narrator

== Production ==
Film rights to the book were bought by Film Australia and Gil Brealey was assigned to direct. It was originally intended that Ann McDonald play herself but she had grown too big by the time she left hospital so 9-year-old Tina Arhondis was cast instead. Shooting started in September 1983 and went for four weeks, mostly at the Convent of the Good Shepherd in Melbourne.

== Reception ==
Annie's Coming Out won three 1984 Australian Film Institute Awards for Best Film, Best Adapted Screenplay and Best Lead Actress (Angela Punch McGregor). It was nominated for four other AFI awards. The film won the Prize of the Ecumenical Jury at the 1984 Montréal World Film Festival.

The film was not a large commercial success but it screened in the US as A Test of Love.

== Home media ==
Annie's Coming Out was released on DVD by Umbrella Entertainment in October 2010. The DVD is compatible with all region codes and includes special features such as press clippings, photos, and audio commentary with Gil Brealey, Rosemary Crossley, Chris Borthwick and Anne McDonald.

== Soundtrack album ==
The film score recording by Simon Walker, produced by Philip Powers, was released in 2009 by 1M1 Records (1M1CD1026).

== See also ==
- Rapid Prompting Method

Films

- Autism Is a World
- Deej
- Wretches & Jabberers

Books

- The Reason I Jump
- Fall Down 7 Times Get Up 8
