= List of abuse allegations made through facilitated communication =

There have been instances in which a person, through facilitated communication (FC)—a scientifically discredited technique that attempts to aid communication by people with autism or other communication disabilities who are non-verbal—seems to disclose experiences of abuse. Often, the alleged abuse is sexual and contains "extensive, explicit, pornographic details". While facilitators are taught to expect their communication partners to reveal sensitive, personal issues, researchers find that facilitators involved in this type of case mistakenly suspect abuse by family members or others.

In 1993, Frontline's "Prisoners of Silence" featured the story of Gerry Gherardi of New Hampshire, who was accused, through FC-generated messages, of sexually abusing his son. Despite protestations of innocence, Gherardi was forced to stay away from his home for six months. The charges were dropped when court-ordered double-blind tests showed that Gherardi's son could not write. In the same year, Bernard Rimland reported in a New York Times article that he knew of about 25 cases in which families were accused through facilitated communication of sexually abusing their children.

By 1995, there were sixty known cases, with untold numbers of others settled without reaching public visibility. Since then, the number of cases continues to increase. In addition to accusations of sexual abuse, facilitators, reportedly, have developed sexual feelings for their communication partners, and, relying on FC for consent, initiated sexual and physical contact with people in their care, raising serious ethical and legal problems for facilitators, protective service agencies, law enforcement, court officials, educators, and family members alike.

== 1990s ==
=== "Carla" case ===
About the same time FC was gaining popularity in the United States in the early 1990s, the Guardianship and Administration Board in Melbourne, Australia, was reviewing a landmark case involving allegations of sexual abuse and facilitated communication. The 1990 case involved a 28-year-old woman (pseudonym "Carla") with severe disabilities who was removed, twice, from her home by state authorities because of messages obtained through FC that she was being sexually abused at home.

Nine facilitators, including Rosemary Crossley, one of Australia's leaders in FC movement, over a course of nine months, obtained messages through FC that allegedly involved incest, rape and other sexual depredations. Crossley had assessed Carla in August 1988, indicating that her ability to spell was very good, and expressing amazement at the extent of Carla's vocabulary and perceptions during the evaluation. Officials removed Carla from the home when one of the facilitators, through another facilitated session, indicated Carla threatened suicide if she was not removed from her home.

Following a 15-month custody battle, the Guardianship Board accepted extensive evidence from psychological and other tests that agreed that the woman had a severe intellectual disability, was unable to differentiate between letters of the alphabet, and could not have authored the messages. Double-blind testing, conducted by psychologists Alan Hudson and Beatrice Melita, demonstrated that the only meaningful responses obtained through FC were when the facilitator knew the questions being asked of Carla. The court determined that Carla and her family were "victims" and admonished the facilitators: "the one step that would have prevented the case occurring—prior verification that the woman could communicate with facilitated communication—had not been done." All charges were dropped and custody was granted to Carla's family.

=== Storch case ===
In 1991, Mark Storch, of Shokan, New York, was charged with abusing his daughter after the Department of Social Services received reports that his daughter, Jenny, a 14-year-old with autism, had, through facilitated communication, disclosed recurring sexual assaults, including 200 vaginal and anal rapes. Storch's wife, Laura, was charged with neglect. Despite no physical evidence of abuse, inconsistencies in the facilitated testimony, and questions about the facilitator's troubling personal history, officials pressed charges, which led to a costly, 10-month legal battle. The case was dropped because FC lacked sufficient testing and acceptance in the scientific community.

Bennett Leventhal, head of pediatric psychology at the University of Chicago, testified in the Storch's defense, saying:

The obligation of an investigator into a new technique is to show how it works. With FC, there's this basic assumption of "What can it hurt?" The Storch trial is living proof of how dangerous it is to embrace new science before it has been tested.

=== Wheaton case ===
In 1992, the parents of Betsy Wheaton, a 16-year-old nonspeaking person with autism, were, through facilitated communication, falsely accused of sexually abusing their daughter. The facilitator, Janyce Boynton, who was trained in FC at the University of Maine, interpreted Betsy's hitting and scratching during facilitated sessions as reenactments of abuses occurring at home. Boynton reported these incidents to the state's Department of Health and Human Services, and Betsy and her brother were removed from the home. The brother was also implicated. The parents' attorney hired Howard Shane of Boston Children's Hospital to conduct testing of authorship. It was determined through double blind testing that Boynton, not Betsy, was authoring the messages obtained through facilitation. Boynton, unlike many other facilitators who have undergone testing, accepted the results, stopped using FC, and persuaded the school system to stop using FC as well.

Looking back on her training, Boynton could see that it had been inadequate. She had not worked with anyone who was nonverbal, and she was pronounced "good to go" after only two days of mostly lectures. She knew that disabled people suffer relatively high levels of abuse, was taught that there was a strong affinity between patient and facilitator, so, she has stated, "you get this sense in your head that you're the only one this person trusts... And then you get overly protective and you have that thought in your head that maybe they've been abused." She describes the process of facilitating as "everything happening at once.... you're so distracted by other things." Until she was tested, she fully believed that she was protecting Betsy. Howard Shane states: "You're expected to believe (the person has been abused) and then, bam, the accusation happens."

Of the Wheaton case, psychologist James T. Todd wrote:

The real responsibility for the Wheaton tragedy lies with Rosemary Crossley, Douglas Biklen, and their acolytes. Despite all of their advanced degrees, professional credentials, and university appointments, they failed in their professional and ethical responsibility to show that FC was safe and effective before foisting it on the world. Having donned the trappings of expertise and put themselves out as authorities, they incurred what John Erskine called "the moral obligation to be intelligent." Long before they even thought to put pen to paper and write their extravagant tales of extraordinary awakenings, they should have heeded not just the technical lessons of Clever Hans, but the findings of more than a century of scientific and practical investigations of automatic writing, experimenter bias, mental telepathy, unconscious influence, subjective validation, stimulus leakage, expectancy effects, deception and self-delusion. Had they exercised due scientific diligence, the developers of FC would have quickly realized that they had done nothing better than turn pliant arms into Ouija planchettes and reinvent the seance.

=== Cracchiolo case ===
In 1993, Gregory Cracchiolo, who taught students with severe developmental disabilities in Whittier, California, was accused of sexually assaulting four of his students, with facilitated communication being the only source of evidence. The student making the allegation was unable to communicate by speech to verify these claims. Cracchiolo lost his job and faced 11 felony counts of forcible sodomy and forced oral copulation. He faced a maximum sentence of 88 years in prison. While authorship testing was not done, the charges were dropped after a month, because FC lacked the scientific evidence to determine its efficacy. The prosecutor continued to believe the abuses occurred. Cracchiolo blamed the case for ending his teaching career.

=== Lehman case ===
In 1993, David and Jean Lehman of Newmarket, Ontario, were charged with sexually abusing their 20-year-old son, Derek, based solely on evidence obtained through facilitated communication. At birth, Derek had been diagnosed with autism and severe intellectual disability and, at the time of the allegations, lived in a group home. He was not able to speak, but could use two hand signals: "please" and "toilet". He was not able to recognize numbers beyond three, and was not aware of his own sex, or that of others.

During authorship testing, conducted by Mary Konstantareas, psychology professor at the University of Guelph, Derek was not able to name an object that he had seen but his facilitators had not. After a year-long court battle, the charges were proven unfounded and dropped. The ordeal left the Lehmans in debt, nearly losing their business, and drove David Lehman to nearly committing suicide. The Lehmans filed an $8.5 million civil suit and accepted a settlement for an undisclosed amount. They were also granted custodianship of their son.

=== John Pinnington case ===
In 1998, middle-aged John Pinnington changed careers to focus on the care and treatment of individuals with autism (having been inspired by his experiences with his own autistic step-son). After several years of work in the field, Pinnington was hired by Thomley Hall College, a specialist facility for students aged 16–25 with autism, where he was promoted to the position of Deputy Headmaster in 2004. At the time of his promotion the college was aware that between the years 2000 and 2002, two young adults with autism had accused Pinnington of sexual abuse. Those charges, made during facilitated communication sessions, had been investigated by both the college and police and found to be without foundation. In 2005, Pinnington learned that a third young man with autism had made an abuse allegation. Again, the charges were made during a facilitated communication session.

Despite the dismissal of all charges by police investigators, laws in the UK required that a record of the allegations remain in Pinnington's police record, and the charges came to light later in 2005 when a new set of background checks were mandated by a charity that had taken over the college. Despite the lack of any independent evidence of the abuse, fact that all of the allegations had been made during FC sessions, and that one of the facilitators was the mother of an accuser, Pinnington was fired from his position by the charity.

Pinnington was unsuccessful in his attempts to have the abuse allegations expunged from his record, and in 2008, in a controversial landmark decision, his appeal to the High Court was denied, even though the court agreed that there was "strong doubt" about the veracity of the allegations. The baseless accusations, made during FC sessions, permanently ended Pinnington's career as an educator and so seriously damaged his reputation that he has been unable to find employment of any kind.

=== England case ===
In 1999, a 50-year-old businessman from the south of England was accused, through FC, of abusing his 17-year-old son. The son, reportedly, had severe autism and epileptic seizures and was not able to speak. Dame Elizabeth Butler-Sloss, President of the High Court Family Division, ruled on the first case of its kind in England, saying FC was "dangerous", and should not be used by any UK courts to "back up or dismiss allegations of abuse". She also indicated the court was "entirely satisfied the allegations were unfounded", since there was no evidence that the father or anyone else was a perpetrator, or the abuse had ever occurred.

== 2000s ==
=== Wendrow case ===
In 2007, Julian Wendrow of West Bloomfield, Michigan, was charged with sexually abusing his daughter and placed in jail for 80 days. His wife, Tali, was accused of severely mentally and emotionally abusing her children, and forced to wear an electronic tether. Their 13-year-old son was also named as a perpetrator. Both children were placed in foster care.

The allegations resulted from messages obtained via FC at school while an aide helped guide the girl's hand. The case was a "virtual rerun" of the 1992 Betsy Wheaton case. When lawyers questioned the girl without the facilitator present, she was unable to answer questions, including "What color is your sweater?" and "Are you a boy or a girl?" The case fell apart due to lack of physical evidence of abuse and facilitated testimony that contained information inconsistent with the Wendrow family, lifestyle and living arrangements: relatives that did not exist, Christian theology attributed to observant Jewish parents, nonexistent rooms and photos.

The girl testified, through FC, that she was afraid of her father because of a gun. Police found no guns in the home. As a result, the charges were dropped and the children returned to their parents. Prosecutors continued to believe the girl was afraid of her father. A wrongful arrest suit was settled for $1.8 million, which, according to the attorney representing the Police Department, was a business decision made by the insurance company and was not an admission of wrongdoing or liability.

== 2010s ==
=== Gigi Jordan case ===
On February 3, 2010, Gigi Jordan of New York was found by police in the Peninsula New York hotel. She was incoherent from a drug overdose. Jude Mirra, her eight-year-old son, was also found dead from a mixture of painkillers and anti-inflammatories which Jordan force-fed him. Jordan, at the time, was under the impression Mirra wanted to die because of alleged sexual abuse typed out during sessions involving FC. Despite testifying that she was "by Jude's side at all hours of the day", Jordan believed the biological father, her ex-husband, had been abusing the boy for years, and that Mirra's diagnosis of autism was actually a catatonic psychosis brought on by the alleged abuse. To Jordan, the killing was "altruistic filicide"—a mercy killing.

Mirra, who was diagnosed with autism, was not able to speak. Jordan had indicated that Mirra, through FC, had told her "I need a lot of drugs to die peacefully" and "I wish you do it soon." Although Jordan and Mirra communicated by typing together on a BlackBerry, no witnesses ever observed Mirra type by himself. In reviewing typed messages provided by Jordan of her son's disclosures, court officials questioned whether Mirra had the capacity to understand or spell words like "aggressively" and "sadistic".

Jordan also believed her second ex-husband, a pharmaceutical executive, was stealing millions of dollars from her, and wanted her killed. Both men denied the accusations. No evidence of any crimes committed in connection with the case were found against either of the two men. In November 2014, the jury accepted Jordan's claim of extreme emotional disturbance and found her guilty of first-degree manslaughter in the death of her son. On December 31, 2022, she was found dead at her home hours after U.S. Supreme Court Justice Sonia Sotomayor revoked her bail. Her death was ruled a suicide.

=== Wales case ===
In 2012, the parents of a young woman with severe intellectual disabilities, autism, and profound communication problems were reunited with their daughter after the Public Services Ombudsman for Wales concluded they had been wrongfully arrested on suspicion of serious sexual assault obtained via FC. The family had been separated for six months. No charges were brought against the parents. Rowan Wilson, a psychiatrist, had, on November 8, 2010, assessed the woman's mental capacity using FC, though he, admittedly, had no knowledge or experience of the system. He also failed to consider the discrepancy between the woman's language fluency with and without FC. The Medical Practitioners Tribunal Services ruled that Wilson was still fit to practice because "he had shown remorse and insight into the errors he was highly unlikely to repeat." Wilson participated in further training in autism.

=== Hialeah case ===
In 2018, Jose Cordero spent 35 days in jail and was barred from seeing his family for months after he was accused of abusing his seven-year-old autistic son. The accusations arose through the child's teacher using the "hand-over-hand" method of FC. Miami-Dade County prosecutors grew suspicious when, through the facilitator the boy made even more outlandish claims and used language not typical for someone that age. After being paired with a different teacher and specialist, the child was no longer able to reproduce a single word. Coupled with negative DNA testing, this resulted in the charges being dropped. According to a final State Attorney report, "Due to significant inconsistencies within the victim's disclosures coupled with controversial means by which the disclosure was obtained, and a lack of corroborating witnesses, the state would be unable to prove this case beyond a reasonable doubt at this time."

The case raises questions about whether or not the teacher, Saul Fumero, made up the allegations, and whether the district was aware he was using a discredited communication method. Fumero acknowledged that he has had no formal training in FC. A Miami-Dade Schools spokeswoman did not say whether the district would review Fumero's actions, but noted that teachers are required by law to immediately report allegations of abuse. The spokeswoman, Daisy Gonzalez-Diego, added that the district "does not endorse the facilitated communication method and does not provide training" for it because it is not accepted by those working in the field of "augmentative and alternative communication".

== 2020s ==
=== Plantan v. Smith case ===
In January 2021, Kevin Plantan, father of a fifteen-year-old girl with regressive autism (child named SP in court documents), was arrested and charged with raping his daughter SP when she was five and nine years old. Plantan and SP's mother Smith were divorced and had a contentious relationship. SP lived with her mother in Hanover County, Virginia, and Plantan lived in Naples, Florida. Plantan was arrested based on writings written by SP though a facilitator. Plantan states to podcaster Amanda Knox that he wanted to believe that his daughter had been communicating with her own words over the years they were writing to each other, and on his monthly visits with her. When the arresting officer showed him the letter accusing him (Plantan) with abuse, Plantan's first response was devastation that SP was not really writing as he had thought.

The Hanover County Circuit Court judge refused to believe Plantan, who was held in prison for ten months, until he was released clearing him of all charges. Experts such as Howard Shane and James Todd advised Plantan's legal council, explaining facilitated communication and the ideomotor effect. The mother Smith was ordered by Shane to test for authorship. While waiting for the court and Shane to pick a date for the test, Smith withdrew the charges if Plantan would agree to never see their daughter again. The judge, believing that Smith was not acting in good faith, released Plantan from prison, and the case against Plantan was eventually dropped.

Plantan filled a civil suit "against his ex-wife, the occupational therapists, and the investigating officer for malicious prosecution, but that effort ultimately failed." As of January 2025, Plantan was attempting to rebuild his life, and his ex-wife is homeschooling SP and continuing to use FC with her. Plantan has not seen his daughter since before his arrest.
