= Steven Laureys =

Belgian neurologist (born 1968)

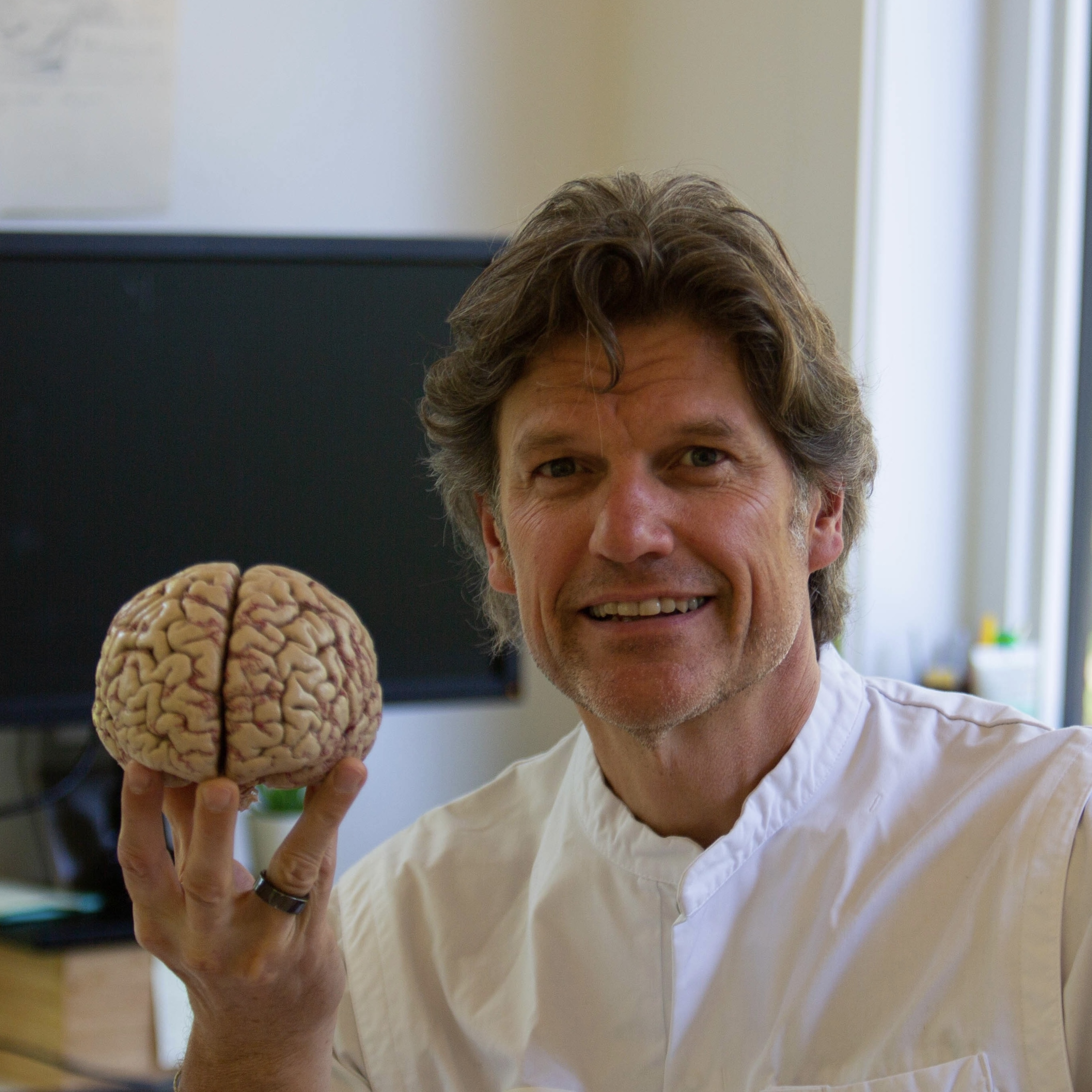
- Dr. Steven Laureys in his office
- Born: 24 December 1968 (age 57); Leuven, Belgium
- Citizenship: Belgium
- Education: PhD (2000)
- Alma mater: University of Liège Vrije Universiteit Brussel
- Scientific career
- Fields: Neurology

Steven Laureys (born 24 December 1968 in Leuven) is a Belgian neurologist. He is principally known as a clinician and researcher in the field of neurology of consciousness.

== Career ==
Laureys graduated as a Medical Doctor from the Vrije Universiteit Brussel, Belgium, in 1993. While specializing in neurology he entered a research career and obtained his MSc in Pharmaceutical Medicine working on pain and stroke using in vivo microdialysis and diffusion MRI in the rat (1997). Drawn by functional neuroimaging, he moved to the Cyclotron Research Center at the University of Liège, Belgium, where he obtained his PhD studying residual brain function in the vegetative state in 2000. He is board-certified in neurology (1998) and in end-of-life and palliative medicine (2004).

He currently leads the Coma Science Group at the Cyclotron Research Centre of the University of Liège, Belgium. He is clinical professor of neurology, at the Liège University Hospital and Research Director at the National Fund for Scientific Research.

Laureys is chair of the World Federation of Neurology's Coma and Disorders of Consciousness Research Group and of the European Neurological Society's Subcommittee on Coma and Disorders of Consciousness. Since 2009, he is invited professor at the Royal Academy of Belgium.

== Research ==
His team assesses the recovery of neurological disability and of neuronal plasticity in severely brain damaged patients with altered states of consciousness by means of multimodal functional neuroimaging. It aims at characterizing the brain structure and the residual cerebral function in patients who survive a severe brain injury: patients in coma, vegetative state, minimally conscious state and locked in syndrome.

The importance of this project is twofold. First, these patients represent a problem in terms of diagnosis, prognosis, treatment and daily management. Second, these patients offer the opportunity to explore human consciousness, which is presently one major conundrum neurosciences have to solve. Indeed, these patients present a complete, nearly graded, range of conscious states from unconsciousness (coma) to full awareness (locked-in syndrome).

This research confronts clinical expertise and bedside behavioral evaluation of altered states of consciousness with state-of-the-art multimodal imaging combining the information from positron emission tomography (PET), functional magnetic resonance imaging (fMRI), structural MRI, electroencephalography (EEG), event related potential (ERP) and transcranial magnetic stimulation (TMS) data.

== See also ==
- Rom Houben, a conscious man incorrectly identified as comatose by Laureys, who made insufficiently rigorous tests of alleged facilitated communication
