= The Diving Bell and the Butterfly =

Autobiography and memoir of Jean-Dominique Bauby

- Author: Jean-Dominique Bauby
- Language: French
- Genre: Autobiography, Memoir
- Publisher: Éditions Robert Laffont
- Publication date: March 6, 1997
- Publication place: France
- ISBN: 978-0-375-40115-2

The Diving Bell and the Butterfly (original French title: Le Scaphandre et le Papillon) is a memoir by journalist Jean-Dominique Bauby. It describes his life before and after a massive stroke left him with locked-in syndrome.

The French edition of the book was published on March 7, 1997. It sold the first 25,000 copies on the day of publication, reaching 150,000 in a week. It went on to become a number one bestseller across Europe. Its total sales are now in the millions.

== Plot summary ==
On December 8, 1995, Bauby, the editor-in-chief of French Elle magazine, suffered a stroke and lapsed into a coma. He awoke 20 days later, mentally aware of his surroundings, but physically paralyzed with what is known as locked-in syndrome, with the only exception some movement in his head and eyes. Further, his right eye had to be sewn up because of irritation.

Bauby wrote the entire book by blinking his left eyelid, which took him two months working 3 hours a day, 7 days a week. Using partner assisted scanning, a transcriber repeatedly recited a French language frequency-ordered alphabet (E, S, A, R, I, N, T, U, L, etc.), until Bauby blinked to choose the next letter. The book took Bauby about 200,000 blinks to write at an average of approximately two minutes per word.

The book also chronicles everyday events for a person with locked-in syndrome. These events include playing at the beach with his family, getting a bath, and meeting visitors while in hospital at Berck-sur-Mer. On March 9, 1997, two days after the book was published, Bauby died of pneumonia.

== Adaptations ==
In 1997, Jean-Jacques Beineix directed a 27-minute television documentary, "Assigné à résidence" (released on DVD in the U.S. as "Locked-in Syndrome" with English subtitles), that captured Bauby in his paralyzed state. He also explored as the process of composing the book.

Artist/director Julian Schnabel released a feature-film adaptation of the book in 2007, starring Mathieu Amalric as Bauby. The film was nominated for several international awards and won best director that year at the Cannes Film Festival.

In 2019, The Dallas Opera was awarded a National Endowment for the Arts grant to commission The Diving Bell and the Butterfly, an opera based on Le Scaphandre et le Papillon by Jean-Dominique Bauby. It was composed by Joby Talbot with a libretto by Gene Scheer. It premiered on November 3, 2023 after facing production delays due to the COVID-19 pandemic.
