= Deej =

2017 documentary by Robert Rooy

- Directed by: Robert Rooy
- Written by: David James Savarese
- Release date: July 31, 2017 (Woods Hole)
- Running time: 72 minutes

Deej is a 2017 American documentary about David James (DJ) Savarese, a nonspeaking autistic teenager who communicates with a voice synthesizer. The film has been criticized as using the scientifically discredited facilitated communication technique.

== Background ==
The film was directed by Robert Rooy. David James Savarese, known as DJ or Deej, was also credited as a director and co-producer of the documentary. The film depicts Savarese as an activist with the goal of promoting communication access for nonspeaking autistic people as part of the neurodiversity movement.

Savarese was adopted from the foster care system and diagnosed early in life as autistic. As a child, his adoptive parents struggled to ensure his inclusion in the local public school system. Eventually winning the right for Savarese to receive education in public schools, his parents framed their challenges as a civil rights struggle against ableism. Since the events featured in Deej, Savarese was awarded a degree from Oberlin College.

Deej aired nationally on PBS in October 2017.

== Criticism ==
The film's relationship to facilitated communication was the subject of one critical essay in a peer reviewed journal. Behavioral scientist and author Craig Foster notes that Deej is never shown independently communicating or exhibiting his "hidden intelligence", even though the documentary implies that he does. Foster states the documentary does not mention that scientific studies have raised questions about facilitated communication and that "skepticism toward facilitated communication is necessary to ameliorate its harmful influence and to encourage genuine acceptance of people with complex communication needs."

Janyce L. Boynton, a former facilitator who has become a critic of facilitated communication, judges the film in a review to be "uncritical promotion" of facilitated communication and notes that the film's editors "chose to leave out some vital information." She concludes that the documentary is a "missed opportunity to teach people what about what living with autism is really like" and that the story the film tells is "one sided and built on facilitator-authored messages."

== Awards ==
- Peabody award
- Chagrin Documentary Festival – Winner, Best Feature
- Indigo Moon Film Festival – Winner, Best Documentary
- Newburyport Film Festival – Audience Award
- Superfest Disability Film Festival – Best Feature
