= David Beukelman =

American speech and language pathologist

David R. Beukelman was an American speech-language pathologist who specialized in augmentative and alternative communication and communication disorders associated with neurological conditions. He was the Barkley Professor Emeritus of Communication Disorders at the University of Nebraska–Lincoln and used to be the Director of Research and Education of the Communication Disorders Division, Munroe/Meyer Institute of Genetics and Rehabilitation, University of Nebraska Medical Center, Omaha, Nebraska.

He was a Senior Researcher in the Institute for Rehabilitation Science and Engineering at Madonna Rehabilitation Hospital in Lincoln, Nebraska.

Beukelman died on February 5, 2022.

== Works ==
- Beukelman, D. & Light, J. (2020). Augmentative and alternative communication: Supporting children and adults with complex communication needs (5th Edition), Paul H. Brookes Publishers. ISBN 9781598573749
- Light, J., McNaughton, D., Beukelman, D., Fager, S., Fried-Oken, M., Jakobs. T., & Jakobs, E. (2019). Challenges and new opportunities in augmentative and alternative communication: Research and technology development to enhance communication and participation for individuals with complex communication needs. Augmentative and Alternative Communication.
- McNaughton, D., Light. J., Beukelman, D., Klein, C., Nieder, D., Nazareth, G. (2019). Building capacity in AAC: A person-centered approach to supporting full participation for people with complex communication needs. Augmentative and Alternative Communication.
- Light, J., Thiessen, A., Beukelman, D., & Fager, S. (2019) Designing AAC displays for individual with developmental or acquired disabilities: State of the science and future research directions. Augmentative and Alternative Communication.
- "Becoming a Successful Faculty Member:: Conversation with a Safe Mentor", Author David R. Beukelman, Amazon, 2017
- Beukelman, D., Hakel, M., Koch Fager, S., Marshall, J., Pfeiffer, C. (2017). Velopharyngeal Dysfunction in Speakers with Neurological Conditions. ASHA: Cleft Palate Perspectives, 2, 18–22.
- Beukelman, D. & Nordness, A. (2017). Patient-Provider Communication for People with Severe Dysarthria: Referral Policies that Lead to Systems Change. Seminars in Speech and Language, 38, 239–250.
- Nordness, A. & Beukelman, D. (2017). Patient Provider Communication Across Medical Settings. Topic in Language Disorders. 37, 334–347.
- Beukelman, D., Hux, K., Dietz, A., McKelvey, M., & Weissling, K. (2015). Using Visual Scene Displays as Communication Support Options for People with Chronic, Severe Aphasia: A Summary of AAC Research and Future Research Directions. Augmentative and Alternative Communication, 31, 234–245.
- "Patient-Provider Communication: Roles of Speech-Language Pathologists and Other Health Care Professionals", Sarah Blackstone, David R. Beukelman, Kathryn M. Yorkston, Plural Publishing, Inc. 2015, ISBN 9781598573749
- Augmentative and alternative communication: Supporting children and adults with complex communication needs, Authors David R. Beukelman, Pat Mirenda, Paul H. Brookes Pub. Co., 2013, ISBN 9781598573749 (4th Edition)
- "Supporting Communication for Adults with Acute and Chronic Aphasia", Editors Nina Simons-Mackie, Julia King, David R. Beukelman (2014). Paul H. Brookes Pub. Co. ISBN 9781598572681
- Management Motor Speech Disorders, Authors Kathryn M. Yorkston, David R. Beukelman, Edythe A. Strand, Mark Hakel (3rd Edition). Pro-ed, Austin, Tx., 2010, ISBN 978-1-4164-0434-7
- Augmentative Communication Strategies for Adults with Acute and Chronic Medical Conditions. Editors David R. Beukelman, Kathryn L. Garrett, Kathryn M. Yorkston, Paul H. Brookes Pub. Co., 2007, ISBN 978-1-55766-875-2
