= Douglas Biklen =

American educator (born 1945)

- Born: Douglas Paul Biklen; September 8, 1945 (age 81)
- Occupations: University faculty (retired); fine art photographer
- Known for: Facilitated Communication (discredited)
- Spouse: Sari Biklen

Academic background
- Education: Bowdoin College
- Alma mater: Syracuse University

Academic work
- Discipline: Education
- Website: biklenartphotography.com

Douglas Paul Biklen (born September 8, 1945) is an American educator, fine art photographer, leading proponent of facilitated communication, a scientifically discredited technique which purports to allow non-verbal people (particularly those on the autism spectrum) to communicate, and an advocate of educational inclusion. A graduate of Bowdoin College, Biklen joined Syracuse University in 1969 and completed his doctorate there in 1973. He was controversially appointed Dean of the Syracuse University School of Education in 2005 and retired in 2014. Biklen has authored and co-authored several books and served on production teams for several documentary films, including 2004's Autism Is a World.

== Career ==
Biklen served in the Peace Corps in Sierra Leone during the 1960s, graduated from Bowdoin College in 1967 and received a Doctor of Philosophy from Syracuse in 1973 where he researched intellectual disabilities in individuals in state-run mental hospitals and schools. Upon completion of his doctorate, Biklen became professor at the Syracuse University the School of Education’s Cultural Foundations, Teaching, and Leadership programs.

At Syracuse, Biklen founded the Institute on Communication and Inclusion; and was a member of the founding faculty at the Center on Human Policy. In August 2005, Biklen was appointed Dean of the School of Education, a move that was criticized by the Commission for Scientific Medicine and Mental Health and by members of the special education research community. He retired at the end of 2014.

Biklen is a proponent of educational inclusion for students with intellectual disabilities.

== Facilitated communication ==
=== Inception ===
During observations of Rosemary Crossley in Melbourne, Australia in 1989, Biklen learned about the practice of facilitated communication. He returned to the United States and introduced the practice to US speech-language pathologists and special educators.

According to the theory, some individuals whose communication is hindered by developmental coordination disorder (DCD) can communicate with the aid of a facilitator, who supports the client's hand while the client types words on a keyboard. Biklen and other advocates claim that individuals with DCD have a sophisticated understanding of spoken and written language, but verbal or motor difficulties prevent them from speaking or typing without assistance.

=== Debunking ===
Studies have repeatedly found that the messages produced through facilitated communication are authored by the facilitator rather than the client. In all controlled studies where clients and facilitators are given different information (shown two different objects, for example) what is typed responds to what is seen by the facilitator, not the client.

In 1994 the American Psychological Association passed a resolution declaring that "facilitated communication is a controversial and unproved communicative procedure with no scientifically demonstrated support for its efficacy." Critics point out that despite its purportedly inclusive intentions, Biklen's technique undermines educational accessibility as it diverts focus from scientifically proven techniques that could effectively help individuals with DCD to communicate.

== Film productions ==
Biklen co-produced the 2004 film Autism Is a World, directed by Geraldine Wurzburg. It was nominated for an Academy Award for Documentary Short Subject, but its positive portrayal of facilitated communication was criticized by autism researchers. Gina Green of San Diego State University stated that making a film without "even a hint, much less a disclosure" of the evidence against facilitated communication "is appalling". Biklen also produced the film My Classic Life as an Artist: A Portrait of Larry Bissonnette at Syracuse University.

Biklen was an executive producer of the documentary Regular Lives on PBS (1988) and was educational advisor to the HBO documentary Educating Peter and its sequel, Graduating Peter.

== Personal life ==
Biklen lives in Orwell, Vermont with his wife, Sari. He is a fine art photographer whose work has been shown throughout Vermont; in the Syracuse, New York area; and in Melbourne, Australia.

== Books ==
- Biklen, D. (1985). Achieving the Complete School: Strategies for Effective Mainstreaming. Teachers College Press.
- ––(1992). Schooling Without Labels: Parents, Educators, and Inclusive Education. Temple University Press.
- ––(1993). Communication Unbound: How Facilitated Communication is Challenging Traditional Values of Autism and Ability/Disability. Teachers College Press.
- Biklen, D., & Cardinal, D. N. (1999). Contested words, contested science: Unraveling the facilitated communication controversy. NetLibrary, Inc.
- Kluth, P., Straut, D. M., & Biklen, D. P. (2003). Access to academics for all students: Critical approaches to inclusive curriculum, instruction, and policy. Taylor and Francis.
