= International Society for Augmentative and Alternative Communication =

Learned society dedicated to augmentive and alternative communication

The International Society for Augmentative and Alternative Communication (ISAAC) was founded in May 1983 in East Lansing, Michigan, United States. Its stated purpose is to improve the communication abilities and quality of life of individuals with complex communication needs who use augmentative and alternative communication (AAC). ISAAC provides information about AAC services, policies and activities around the world thorough various publications and their website. The society publishes a journal and various other publications, organizes biennial conferences, promotes research on AAC use and AAC development as well as implements various projects.

== Purpose ==
ISAAC works to promote augmentative and alternative communication as a known and valued way of communicating worldwide. The society's vision "is that AAC will be recognized, valued and used throughout the world" and the society's mission "is to promote the best possible communication for people with complex needs". The society encourages research and scholarship as well as works to improve service delivery.

== Structure ==
ISAAC has more than 3700 members from over 60 countries. Members include professionals, AAC users and their families and friends. The society is recognized as a nongovernmental organization in consultative status with the United Nations Economic and Social Council.

National chapters of ISAAC are located in many countries. Chapters exist in Australia, Canada, Denmark, Finland, French-speaking countries and regions, German-speaking countries and regions, India, Ireland, Israel, Italy, Netherlands and Flanders, Norway, Sweden, United Kingdom and United States of America. Each chapter has a wide variety of members. For example, members of the Communication Matters, UK chapter, include: AAC users, families of AAC users, professionals working with AAC users, researchers and academics. The ISAAC International office is based in Toronto, Canada.

== Activities ==
ISAAC has publications including Augmentative and Alternative Communication (AAC), which is the society's official journal. The society also has affiliated publications such as AGOSCI in Focus (formerly known as Australian Group of Severe Communication Impairment).

ISAAC organizes biennial conferences. Each conference includes the sharing of breakthroughs and scientific papers, demonstrations of AAC devices, AAC users' experiences, and social activities. A variety of people attend including professionals and therapists as well as children and adults with complex communication needs and their families. Other conferences and courses are also organized by the society.

ISAAC has implemented 3 projects to help support the organization's vision and meet the society's mission. These projects are the BUILD, LEAD and READ projects.

- The BUILD Project: Building International AAC Communities is focused on developing and maintaining connections amongst different organizations that share a similar vision with ISAAC as well as support human rights issues.
- The LEAD Project: Leadership Project works to create leadership-training programmes for AAC users to help them develop the skills needed to advocate for their rights.
- The READ Project: Research, Education, Awareness and Documentation is a project that is aimed at sharing information with ISAAC members and the broader population about AAC and ISAAC through a variety of languages such as spoken and symbolic. This project also advocates for AAC research and shares findings through the ISAAC website, the on-line database for articles located on the ISAAC website called the ISAAC information exchange and the AAC journal.
