= Locked-in syndrome =

Condition in which a patient is aware but completely paralyzed

- Other names: Cerebromedullospinal disconnection, de-efferented state, pseudocoma, ventral pontine syndrome
- Locked-in syndrome can be caused by a stroke at the level of the basilar artery denying blood to the pons, among other causes.
- Specialty: Neurology, Psychiatry
- Frequency: 0.0001%

Locked-in syndrome (LIS), also known as pseudocoma, is a condition in which a patient is aware but cannot move or communicate verbally due to complete paralysis of nearly all voluntary muscles in their body except for vertical eye movements and blinking. This is due to quadriplegia and bulbar palsy. The person is conscious and sufficiently intact cognitively to communicate with eye movements. Electroencephalography results are normal in locked-in syndrome as these people have retained brain activity such as sleep-wake cycles and attention that is detectable. Fred Plum and Jerome B. Posner coined the term in 1966.

Locked-in syndrome can be separated into subcategories based on symptom severity. This consists of classic locked-in syndrome, characterized by the inability to move distal limbs and facial muscles, but retained ability to blink and move eyes vertically, with preserved cognition and consciousness. Incomplete locked-in syndrome is less severe than classic locked-in syndrome and shares similar preserved abilities as classic locked-in syndrome, but has the hallmark of additional motor abilities, whether that be in the muscles innervating the limbs or face. Complete locked-in syndrome contains the conserved cognition and consciousness as classic locked-in syndrome, but has additional motor deficits that render the individual unable to move their eyes vertically or blink. Locked-in plus is an additional form distinguished by impairments to cognition and consciousness, but contains damage to similar regions of the brainstem affected by other forms, notably the pons, with the addition of other cortical and subcortical regions.

== Signs and symptoms ==
Locked in syndrome is usually characterized by loss of limb function and the inability to speak in otherwise cognitively intact individuals. Those with locked-in syndrome may be able to communicate with others through coded messages by blinking or moving their eyes, which are often not affected by the paralysis. Patients who have locked-in syndrome are conscious and aware, with no loss of cognitive function. They can sometimes retain proprioception and sensation throughout their bodies. Some patients may have the ability to move certain facial muscles, and most often some or all of the extraocular muscles. Individuals with the syndrome lack coordination between breathing and voice. This prevents them from producing voluntary sounds, though the vocal cords themselves may not be paralysed.

Individuals with locked-in syndrome also have intact hearing and subsequent language comprehension. However, these patients might have trouble with voluntary breathing and require assistance due to apnea, ataxia, and hyperpnea. This can be coupled with dizziness and vertigo. Locked-in syndrome patients also have been reported to have involuntary movements such as sucking, chewing, swallowing, yawning, and moaning due to lost pyramidal control of motor systems.

== Causes ==
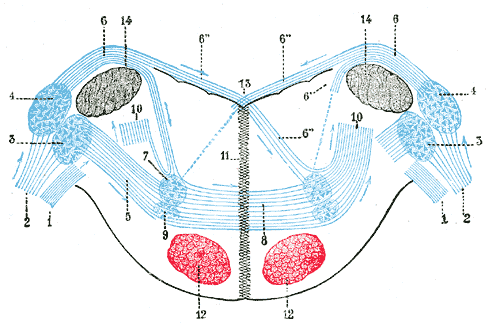
In children, the most common cause is a stroke of the ventral pons.

Unlike persistent vegetative state, in which the upper portions of the brain are damaged and the lower portions are spared, locked-in syndrome is essentially the opposite, caused by damage to specific portions of the lower brain and brainstem, with no damage to the upper brain. Injuries to the pons are the most common cause of locked-in syndrome.

Possible causes of locked-in syndrome include:

- Poisoning cases – More frequently from a krait bite and other neurotoxic venoms, as they cannot usually cross the blood–brain barrier
- Brainstem stroke
- Diseases of the circulatory system
- Drug overdose, such as cocaine or heroin
- Damage to nerve cells, particularly destruction of the myelin sheath, caused by disease or osmotic demyelination syndrome (formerly designated central pontine myelinolysis) secondary to excessively rapid correction of hyponatremia [>1 mEq/L/h])
- A stroke or brain hemorrhage, usually of the basilar artery
- Traumatic brain injury
- Result from lesion of the brainstem
- Trauma

Curare poisoning and paralytic shellfish poisoning mimic a total locked-in syndrome by causing paralysis of all voluntarily controlled skeletal muscles. The respiratory muscles are also paralyzed, but the victim can be kept alive by artificial respiration.

== Diagnosis ==
Locked-in syndrome can be difficult to diagnose. In a 2002 survey of 44 people with locked-in syndrome, it took almost three months to recognize and diagnose the condition after it had begun. However, it has been reported that it can take upwards of four years to receive a diagnosis. Locked-in syndrome may mimic loss of consciousness in patients, or, in the case that respiratory control is lost, may even resemble death. People are also unable to actuate standard motor responses such as withdrawal from pain; as a result, testing often requires making requests of the patient such as blinking or vertical eye movement.

Brain imaging may provide additional indicators of locked-in syndrome, as brain imaging provides clues as to whether or not brain function has been lost. Additionally, an EEG can allow the observation of sleep-wake patterns indicating that the patient is not unconscious but simply unable to move. If no mass or vascular lesion is present on the imaging scan, cerebrospinal fluid examination may be used to reveal an infectious or autoimmune root of the symptoms. Similarly, blood tests can detect fluctuations in sodium concentration, that would be indicative of hyponatremia, as well as glucose levels should be monitored to eliminate the possibility of a hypoglycemic coma.

=== Similar conditions ===
- Akinetic mutism
- Amyotrophic lateral sclerosis (ALS)
- Brain death
- Brain tumor
- Coma
- Guillain–Barré syndrome
- Minimally conscious state
- Myasthenia gravis
- Peripheral neuropathy
- Poliomyelitis
- Unresponsive wakefulness syndrome
- Vegetative state

== Treatment ==
Neither a standard treatment nor a cure is available. The best course of treatment consists of stabilizing the patient and then correcting the underlying cause of the lesion or damage. Stimulation of muscle reflexes with electrodes (NMES) has been known to help patients regain some muscle function. Other courses of treatment are often symptomatic. Assistive computer interface technologies such as Dasher, combined with eye tracking, may be used to help people with LIS communicate with their environment.

Pulmonary complications are the main cause of death in locked-in syndrome patients, therefore chest physiotherapy like deep breathing exercises, position changes, and postural drainage are of high importance during these acute stages.

== Prognosis ==
It is extremely rare for any significant motor function to return, with the majority of locked-in syndrome patients never regaining motor control. However, some people with the condition continue to live for extended periods of time, reported up to a few decades while in exceptional cases, like that of Kerry Pink, Gareth Shepherd, Jacob Haendel, Kate Allatt, and Jessica Wegbrans, a near-full recovery may be achieved with intensive physical therapy. These substantial recoveries in motor movement are thought to be due to potential reorganization of the descending spinal tract pathways. Of those that see improvements in motor functioning, it is thought to be more likely to occur in nonvascular cases of locked-in syndrome compared to vascular patients, as well as distal motor functions being more likely to recover than other facial muscles.

Although depression has been diagnosed in a subset of patients with locked-in syndrome, literature suggests that many patients still report a significantly high quality life over time and that they are happy, with negative respondents having received their diagnosis relatively recently. This content may derive from their retained consciousness that allows the individual to still experience life and participate in activities they enjoy as well as have obligations in their home life. It is true to say that the degree to which a patient can do is dependent on how severe their symptomology is, but many individuals report leaving the house more than once a month, to where there was ultimately no differences in quality of life between a person with locked-in syndrome and a studied healthy control.

== Research ==
New brain–computer interfaces (BCIs) may provide future remedies. One effort in 2002 allowed a fully locked-in patient to answer yes-or-no questions. In 2006, researchers created and successfully tested a neural interface which allowed someone with locked-in syndrome to operate a web browser using an infared camera, navigating a keyboard through selecting letters by blinking or staring at one for a specific period of time. Some scientists have reported that they have developed a technique that allows locked-in patients to communicate via sniffing with nasal pressure being converted to electrical signals. For the first time in 2020, a 34-year-old German patient, paralyzed since 2015 (later also the eyeballs) managed to communicate through an implant capable of reading brain activity.

Other communication initiatives have involved utilizing salivary pH as a proxy of yes/no answers, such as by using mental manipulation for a patient train themselves to vary their salivary pH with mental food imagery such as lemons or milk. Pupil dilation of a patient at bedside has also been used to signal responses using mental arithmetic. These options might be especially of use in instances of more severe locked-in syndrome pathology where eye movements are more restricted, or as an immediate precaution that is cost effective before a more personalized brain-computer interface can be developed.

== See also ==
- Akinetic mutism
- List of people with locked-in syndrome
- The Diving Bell and the Butterfly
- Johnny Got His Gun
- Locked In (House)
- One (Metallica song)
- Paralysis
