= The Empty Fortress =

1967 essay by Bruno Bettelheim

- Author: Bruno Bettelheim
- Genre: Essay
- Publication date: 1967

The Empty Fortress is an essay by Bruno Bettelheim addressing infantile autism through the lens of contemporary Childhood autism in psychoanalysis. It was published in the United States in 1967 and translated into French in 1969 by Roland Humery. The book presents case studies of three nonverbal autistic children—Laurie, Marcia, and Joey—who were cared for at the Orthogenic School, where Bettelheim served as director. The author describes these children as being metaphorically “locked inside an empty fortress” and recounts the therapeutic approaches used by him and his team to establish communication with them. Bettelheim also offers a critical review of existing literature on infantile autism and on the theme of feral children. He advances a causal hypothesis attributing autism to parental attitudes, particularly to an alleged lack of maternal love and empathy, and develops broader reflections on the formation of the self.

The book has been widely criticized as lacking scientific rigor, notably for claiming high “cure” rates without empirical evidence. In particular, the “refrigerator mother” hypothesis advanced by Bettelheim in The Empty Fortress has not been supported by studies using control groups. The theoretical positions presented in the work have since been abandoned in most countries, having been rejected by subsequent scientific research.

Bettelheim had a significant influence on French psychoanalysts working with autistic children. The French National Consultative Ethics Committee later considered that the dissemination of The Empty Fortress contributed to unnecessary suffering among parents of autistic children in France and to delays in the implementation of appropriate interventions.

== Content of the work ==
In its structure, The Empty Fortress adopts the form of a scientific work, with an introduction outlining the author’s hypotheses and methodology, followed by a conclusion and a discussion of the study’s implications. However, the content does not conform to the methodological standards generally required of scientific research.

He quotes Anna Freud as noting that psychoanalysts were beginning to challenge the notion of the rejecting mother. He further argues that ambivalent feelings, including destructive impulses alongside affectionate ones, are present in all parents, and that autism results not from maternal attitudes themselves but from the child’s response to them. Bettelheim also states that:

Throughout this book, I argue that the factor that precipitates the child into infantile autism is the parents’ wish that he not exist.

Bettelheim also cites the psychiatrist Leo Kanner in order to oppose his conclusion that autism has a biological origin.

== History ==
In the United States, The Empty Fortress was initially met with both critical and favorable responses. Overall, positive assessments predominated, contributing to the acceptance in some professional circles of the “refrigerator mother” hypothesis, which attributed the origin of autism to maternal behavior.

According to Katherine DeMaria Severson, Denise Jodlowski, and James Arnt Aune, “The Empty Fortress benefits from Bettelheim’s ethos as well as from Americans’ fascination with the Holocaust and psychoanalysis.” Bettelheim achieved considerable public recognition in the 1960s. Although he had not previously published in peer-reviewed scientific journals, he had substantial experience in presenting his ideas to a broad audience. An abridged version of the case of Joey the Mechanical Boy,” published in Scientific American, was later reused as one of the case studies in The Empty Fortress.

Bettelheim’s work was translated into French in 1969 and circulated among French psychoanalysts. According to Jacques Hochmann, its wider recognition in France was largely due to a 1974 television program by Daniel Karlin, during which Bettelheim also gave lectures and seminars.

== Criticism and controversies ==
The first critic of the ideas presented in The Empty Fortress was Bernard Rimland, who argued for a biological origin of autism. Bettelheim responded in the postface of his book, citing the experience of the Orthogenic School with autistic children.

In 1984, Théo Peeters published Autism: The Shattered Fortress, which challenged Bettelheim’s claims by stating that parents are not responsible for their child’s autism.

In a 2005 article published in Nature, Michael Fitzpatrick described The Empty Fortress as lacking scientific validity.

The book includes a claim of an 85 percent success rate with autistic children at the Orthogenic School, presented using scientific rhetoric but unsupported by controlled studies. This has led some authors to classify the work as pseudoscientific.

The refrigerator mother theory, initially formulated by Leo Kanner and later adopted—without using that term—by Bettelheim, has been classified by J. D. Herbert and others as pseudoscientific. Jacques Hochmann notes that Kanner observed a pattern among parents, describing mothers as superficially affectionate or emotionally distant and fathers as intellectually absorbed. Hochmann emphasizes that the term “refrigerator” originates with Kanner and has been incorrectly attributed to Bettelheim, who never used it.

== Impact of the work ==
Fitzpatrick highlights the significant distress caused by the hypothesis presented in The Empty Fortress, which promoted the psychodynamic theory that autism results from defective parenting. According to this view, children were believed to be affected by “refrigerator mothers” and “distant and obsessive fathers,” leading in some cases to their removal from their families and placement in intensive residential psychotherapy programs. At the time of his 2005 article, Fitzpatrick stated that the book is now of interest primarily from a historical perspective.

According to Dominique Bourdin, the anti-repressive approach of The Empty Fortress and its challenge to parental authority were praised within French psychoanalytic circles. Support for Bettelheim’s ideas by psychoanalysts contributed to opposition from associations of parents of autistic children, who contested the psychoanalytic approach to autism and advocated for biological explanations. In the 1980s, some parents in the United States organized campaigns to remove Bettelheim’s books from local libraries and replace them, reflecting their disagreement with his views.

According to Richard Pollack, the hypothesis attributing responsibility for autism to mothers was gradually discredited and abandoned in many countries, including the United States, the United Kingdom, and Japan. However, it continued to be defended and taught in France in 2005: “Bettelheim remains a kind of hero, and many French psychiatrists and psychoanalysts seem to continue to think that parents bear some responsibility for their children’s pathology, that they always remain guilty for one reason or another, even if this is no longer stated as bluntly.” By 2015, Jean-Noël Trouvé noted that the hypothesis was largely abandoned in France, though it persisted in a few isolated circles within the field of psychopathology.

Opinion no. 102 of the French National Consultative Ethics Committee, issued in November 2007, stated that the dissemination of the ideas presented in Bettelheim’s work contributed to unnecessary distress among mothers of autistic children in France.

The psychoanalytic theories of autism—the psychodynamic theories, including the concept of the ‘empty fortress’—proposed during the 1950s to describe and explain the inner world of children suffering from autism, led to an indictment of parental behavior, and in particular of mothers, described as ‘refrigerator mothers’ or ‘death-dealing mothers’ in the development of the disability. Considering the mother as guilty of her child’s disability, cutting the child’s ties with his or her mother, waiting for the child to express a desire for contact with the therapist while the child is panically afraid of what surrounds him or her, all demonstrate the violence that such an attitude could entail, the suffering it could cause, and the dead end to which this theory could lead in terms of support, treatment, and social integration.

— Jean-Claude Ameisen

Bettelheim’s hypothesis has also been cited as contributing to inadequate educational provision for autistic children in France.

== See also ==
- Bruno Bettelheim

== Bibliography ==
- Bettelheim, Bruno (1998). La forteresse vide : l'autisme infantile et la naissance du soi [The Empty Fortress: Childhood Autism and the Birth of the Self] (in French). Paris: Gallimard. ISBN 2-07-040434-X.
- Fitzpatrick, Michael (2005). "Return to the fortress". Nature. 438 (7064): 26. doi:10.1038/438026a. ISSN 1476-4687.
- Leroy, Martine (2008). L'autisme en changement : de la théorie de la "forteresse vide" à la notion de "trouble envahissant du développement" [Autism in transition: from the “empty fortress” theory to the concept of “pervasive developmental disorder”] (in French).
- Peeters, Théo (1988). Autisme : La forteresse éclatée [Autism: The shattered fortress] (in French). Pro Aid Autisme. ISBN 2-907798-00-6. OCLC 19828507.
- Pollack, Richard (2005). "Bettelheim l'imposteur" [Bettelheim the impostor]. Le Livre Noir de la psychanalyse [The Black Book of Psychoanalysis] (in French). Les Arènes. pp. 533–548. OCLC 19828507.
- Severson, Katherine DeMaria; Jodlowski, Denise; Aune, James Anrt (2007). "Bruno Bettelheim, Autism, and the Rhetoric of Scientic Authority". Autism and Representation (in French). doi:10.4324/9780203935088-8. ISBN 9780203935088.
- Schreibman, Laura Ellen (2005). The science and fiction of autism. Harvard University Press. ISBN 0-674-01931-8. OCLC 58451802.
- Tytell, Pamela. "Bettelheim Bruno (1903-1990)" (in French).
