= Jodi DiPiazza =

American singer (born 2001)

Jodi DiPiazza (born October 3, 2001) is an American musician, songwriter, composer, vocalist, and autism advocate. She was diagnosed with autism some time before her second birthday. A musical prodigy, she has absolute pitch. She learned to play the piano at age three, being able to hear a song and reproduce it. She also plays other instruments (such as guitar, clarinet and drums) and performs in a number of genres.

DiPiazza gained national attention through a series of high-profile performances and television appearances beginning in the early 2010s. She has appeared on national broadcast programs and performed at major venues in the United States, including Broadway theaters, often collaborating with established musicians and performers.

She is a graduate of Rollins College in Orlando, Florida, where she studied music and was inducted into the Pi Kappa Lambda music honor society. In 2025, she released her debut single, marking the beginning of her recording career.

== Performing career ==
In 2012, DiPiazza appeared at Comedy Central's Night of Too Many Stars, an annual fundraiser for autism programs, at New York City's Beacon Theatre. This event included DiPiazza's duet performance of "Firework" with Katy Perry.

In October 2012, DiPiazza was a guest on Good Morning America, where she performed "Tomorrow" from Annie. In April 2013, DiPiazza performed on Fox News Health watch with Dr. Manny. She also performed a duet with Moira Kelly at the Montclair State University. She performed "For Good" from Wicked at the Bergen Performing Arts Center in Englewood, New Jersey. In October, she appeared at the Genius of Autism benefit at the Hudson Theatre with Matt Savage in New York City hosted by Adam Richman.

In 2013, DiPiazza appeared on El Tiempo (Colombian broadcast TV) in an interview with Wilson Vega and performed "The One That Got Away" by Katy Perry. In April 2013, she appeared on the Fox News Street talk television program with Antwan Lewis. She performed "A Dream Is a Wish Your Heart Makes" from the Disney film Cinderella.

On April 2, 2014, DiPiazza was selected to record at the Converse rubber tracks studio for autism awareness with the indie rock group Meridian. In May, 2014 she performed a duet of "On the Street Where You Live" with Laura Benanti. In September 2014, she performed at The Cutting Room, with Jon Batiste: A Benefit for The Louis Armstrong Center for Music and Medicine.

In February 2015, DiPiazza returned to the Night of Too Many Stars fundraiser and collaborated with "Weird Al" Yankovic on his parody, "Yoda". In April 2016, she sang the national anthem on autism awareness night at the New York Red Bulls soccer match. In May, she performed a duet with Stephanie J. Block at the Montclair State University.

On November 18, 2017, DiPiazza once again performed on the Night of Too Many Stars, where she performed "Rise Up" with Tony award winner Cynthia Erivo and The Roots.

On June 25, 2018, DiPiazza made her Broadway debut in the show "Arts for Autism" at the Gershwin Theatre, where she sang "The Girl I Mean to Be" from The Secret Garden as well as a duet of "Corner of the Sky" from Pippen with Tony award nominee Max von Essen and a children's choir of 200.

== Advocacy ==
In 2010, DiPiazza wrote and performed a composition called "Heroes of Autism" for Toys "R" Us to be used in conjunction with a fundraiser for Autism Speaks. This campaign raised over $3,000,000. In 2013, DiPiazza was one of the speakers at the National Autism Conference held at Penn State University where she joined Bridget Taylor of the Alpine Learning Group. In October 2013, she received the Building Futures Award from Children's Aid And Family services for her autism advocacy. DiPiazza has also performed at the ReelAbilities film festival which focuses on films of people with special needs.

In June 2014, DiPiazza performed a concert at the Special Olympics National games in Ewing. She was also the featured guest in Newtown Connecticut at Families United in Newtown (F.U.N.) benefit concert May 19, 2016. She was a host with Pat Battle and Steve Weatherford at the Autism Speaks walk in Metlife Stadium. In April 2017 DiPiazza appeared at a benefit for Autism NJ at Montclair State University and performed a duet with Marin Mazzie of "I Whistle a Happy Tune" from the King and I.

In October 2021, DiPiazza appeared at the Special Olympics Florida Champions Gala, held at the Waldorf Astoria Orlando.

In October 2025, DiPiazza performed at a benefit concert supporting the We Are All Music Foundation for mental health with Living Colour at the City Winery in New York City.

She received the President’s Volunteer Service Award in recognition of her community service efforts.

== In literature ==
DiPiazza was referenced in a Time magazine feature examining educational approaches for autistic children, which discussed her early education at the Alpine Learning Group.

DiPiazza’s early development and educational experiences were documented in a 2006 feature in The Bergen Record.

DiPiazza was featured in the book *Autistic Legends Alphabet*, an illustrated alphabet book of notable individuals on the autism spectrum.

DiPiazza's life story was discussed in the preface of the book In a Different Key: The Story of Autism by John Donvan and Caren Zucker.

DiPiazza has been described in academic literature as an autistic savant, with particular emphasis on her exceptional musical abilities.

== Singles ==
In 2025, DiPiazza released her debut single, marking the beginning of her recording career.

"The First Christmas Day" (2025)

"At the End of the Rainbow" (2026)

"It's So Clear" (2026)
