= John Henry Waddell =

American sculptor (1921–2019)

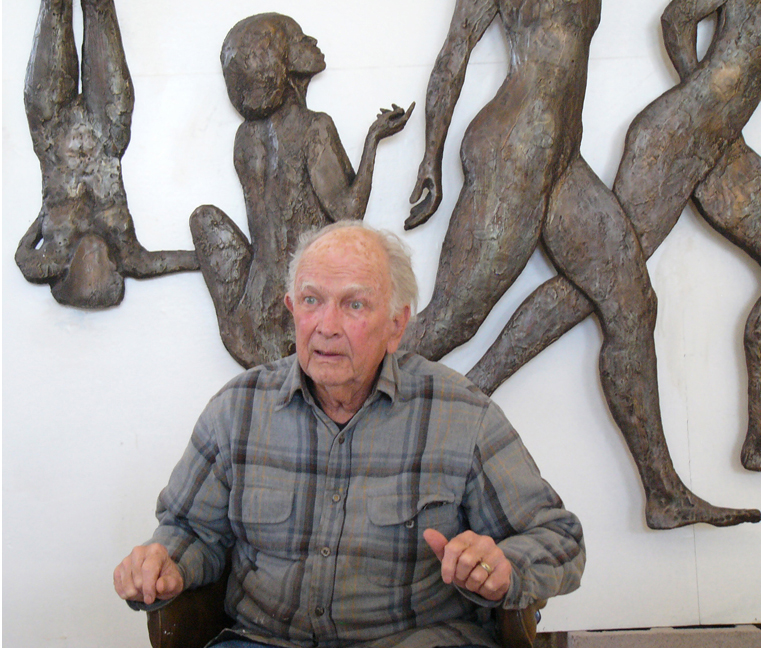
- Waddell in March 2007
- Born: February 14, 1921; Des Moines, Iowa
- Died: November 27, 2019 (aged 98); Verde Valley, Arizona
- Spouses: Elizabeth Owen; Ruth Holland
- Website: www.artbyjohnwaddell.com

John Henry Waddell (February 14, 1921 – November 27, 2019) was an American sculptor, painter and educator. He had a long career in art education and has many sculptures on public display, but he may be best known for That Which Might Have Been—his memorial to the four girls killed in the 1963 bombing of the 16th Street Baptist Church in Birmingham, Alabama.

== Early life ==
Waddell was born in Des Moines, Iowa in 1921 and moved to Evanston, Illinois, at the age of ten. There he began to study art at the Katherine Lord Studio, and by the age of 16 was teaching classes there. In 1939, he graduated from Evanston Township High School and moved to Chicago where he attended the School of the Art Institute.

In 1942, Waddell married his first wife, Elizabeth Owen, and they had three children: Sean Owen, Seamus, and Seanchan Waddell. Elizabeth and John divorced in 1948. At the time, he was working at Buick Aviation Plant, Melrose Park, Illinois—as America had entered World War II.

Waddell's education was interrupted by a stint in the US Army 1943–1945. Serving as Private First Class during the War, one of his contributions was as a muralist of hope. On the GI Bill, Waddell returned to the School of the Art Institute. He earned two master's degrees there and later an Honorary Doctorate from the National College of Education, Chicago (now known as National Louis University).

It was at the Art Institute that Waddell met artist Ruth Holland. In 1949, they were married in a small ceremony with friends and fellow students, Leon Golub and Nancy Spero, as witnesses. Through the decades Ruth appeared in many of his paintings and sculptures. Waddell also became a primary muse in Ruth's work. They remained married until Waddell's death in 2019 and had two additional sons and a daughter: Lindsey and William Waddell and filmmaker Amy Waddell, respectively.

== Career ==
Waddell began having one-man shows of his artwork as early as 1942. He had dozens of such shows over the course of six decades as a professional artist.

His career as an art educator began in earnest in 1947 when he started teaching evening adult classes in the Central YMCA Adult Education Program in Chicago, which he did until 1955. Overlapping with this position was the teaching of art and art education at the National College of Education—from 1949 to 1955. He assumed the position of head of art education at the IIT Institute of Design in 1955. While in Chicago, Waddell designed a program for students with Down's Syndrome and varied mental and physical challenges at Bruno Bettelheim’s Orthogenic School.

In 1957, Waddell moved his family to Arizona and became head of Art Education at Arizona State College (later known as Arizona State University). He retired from ASU in 1964 to devote all of his energies to his artwork.

In 2007, several life-sized bronze sculptures by Waddell were stolen, probably due to the value of the metal after the work has been melted.

== Death ==
Waddell died November 27, 2019, at the age of 98.

== Selected public works ==
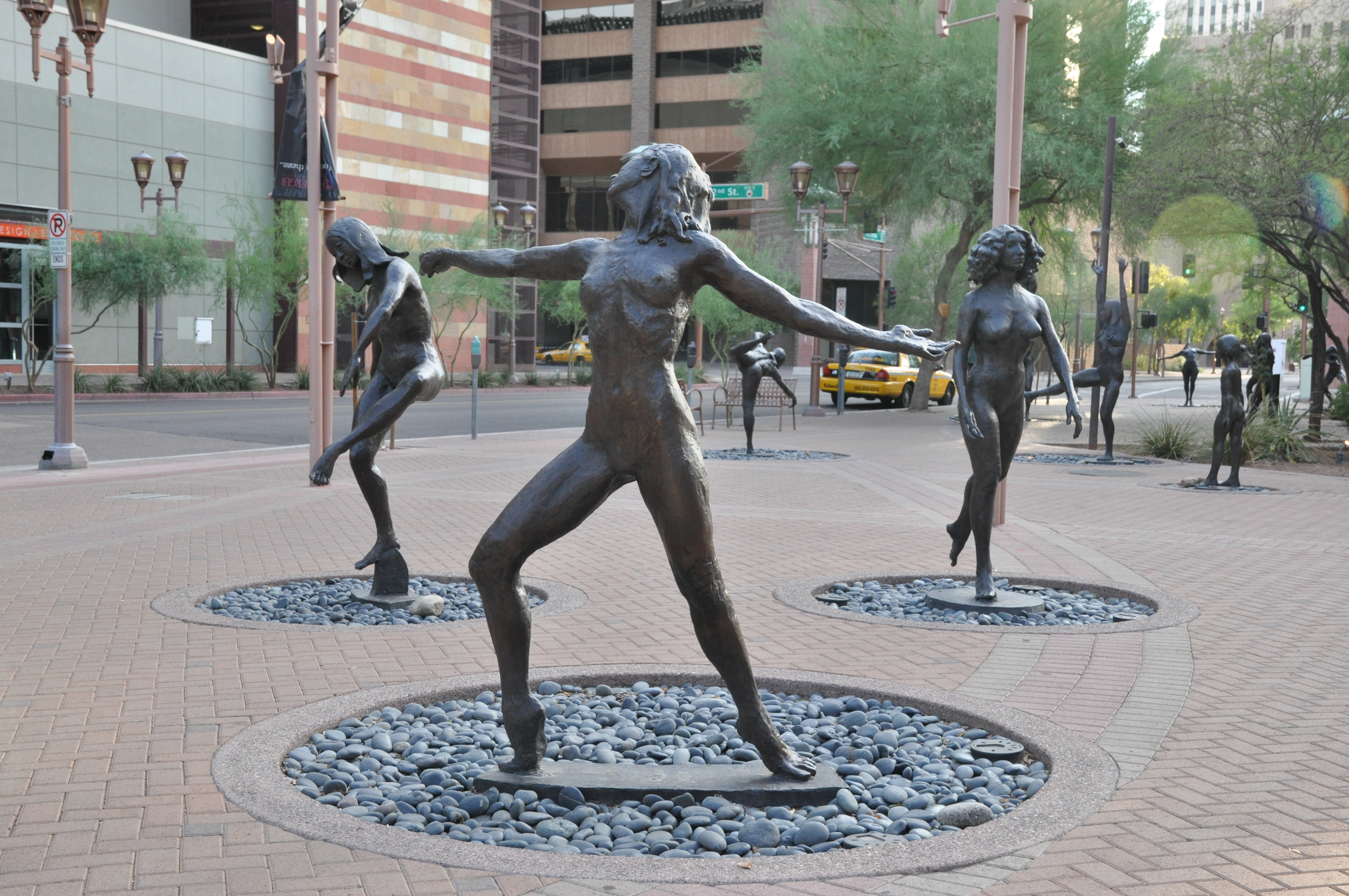
Sculpture outside the Herberger Theater, Phoenix. Photographed in 2009.

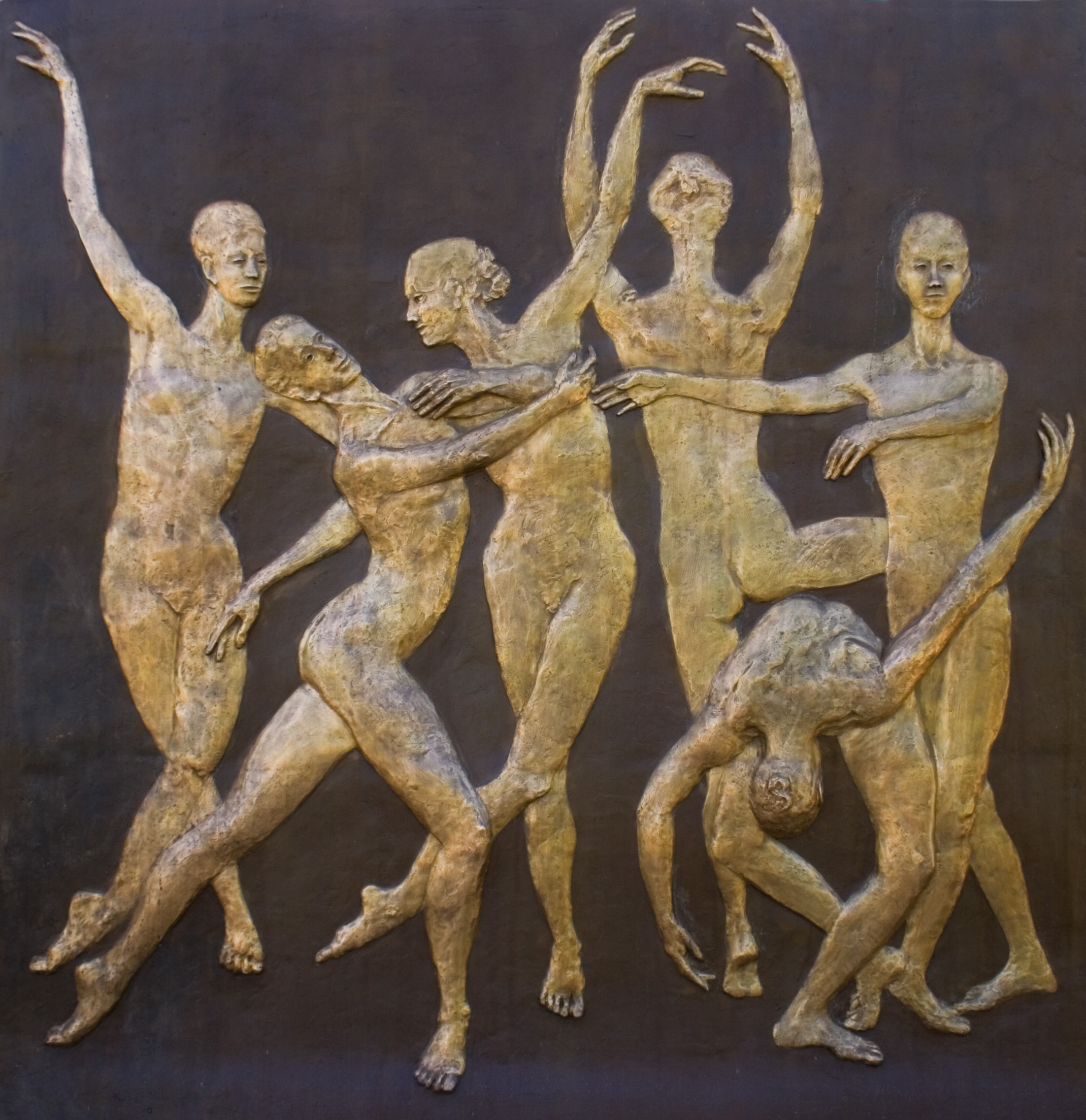
Dancer in Motion (1988). Photographed in 2006.

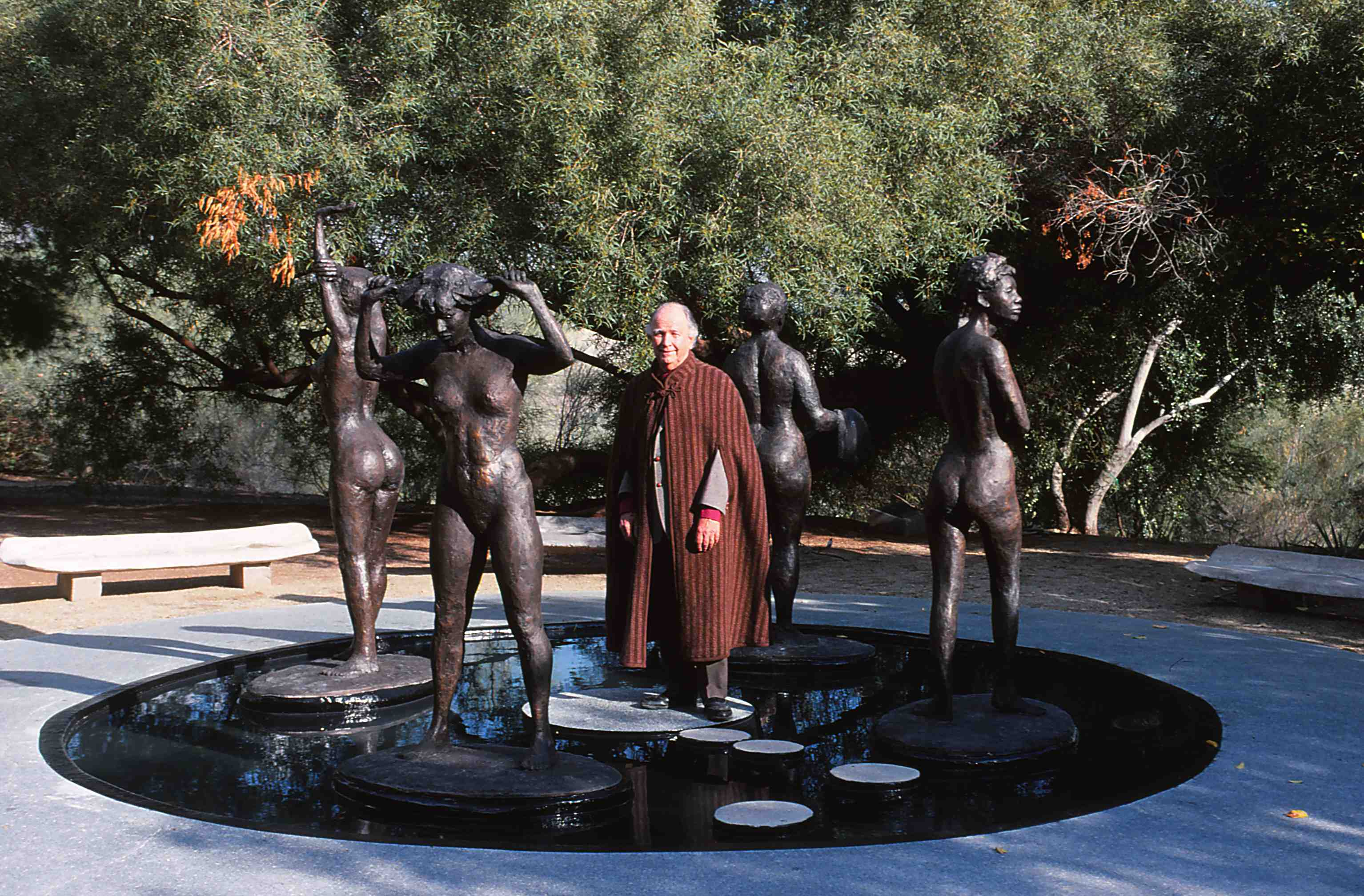
Waddell with his work, That Which Might Have Been, Birmingham 1963, Unitarian Universalist Congregation of Phoenix, cast in 1964. Photographed in 2013.
- Dance Mother (Ruth), - Phoenix Art Museum, Phoenix Arizona 1962
- Dance Daughters, - Yuma Art Center, Yuma, Arizona, 1963
- That Which Might Have Been: Birmingham 1963, - Unitarian Universalist Congregation of Phoenix 1964; George Washington Carver Museum and Cultural Center, Phoenix
- Family, - Maricopa County Building, Phoenix, AZ 1967
- Past and Present. – Glendale Community College, Glendale, Arizona 1968
- Dance, Downtown Phoenix, AZ, 1968 to 1974
- Marlo Seated, Phoenix Public Library, Phoenix AZ, 1977
- Seated Flute Player, Weinstein Center for the Performing Arts, Evanston, Illinois, and University of Arizona, Tucson, Arizona, 1979
- Apogee & Momentum, U.S. Tennis Association, Flushing Meadows, New York 1980 - 1988
- Welcoming Muse, Robert Mondavi Winery, Oakville, California
- I Am That I Am, Congregation Beth Israel (Scottsdale, Arizona), 1982
- Seated Flute Player & Harpist, Ravinia Park, Chicago

== Awards ==
- Performing and Broadcast Arts Hall of Fame, The Herberger Theater (Phoenix), inducted in 2001.
