= Brotherly Love (1999 TV series) =

- Genre: Comedy
- Created by: Tony Humphreys; Bernard McKenna
- Starring: Gregor Fisher; James Fleet; Caroline Langrishe; Tom Watson
- Country of origin: United Kingdom
- Original language: English
- No. of series: 1
- No. of episodes: 6

Production
- Production locations: Glasgow, Scotland, UK

Original release
- Network: BBC1
- Release: 8 October 1999 – 5 November 2000

Brotherly Love is a 1999 sitcom starring Gregor Fisher and James Fleet. The show was made in Scotland and similar to Last of the Summer Wine.

Recently, it has been aired in the United States on various PBS stations as part of 'One Season Wonders.'

== Plot ==
Frank Robertson returns to Invercorrie for his Uncle Archie's funeral and meets up with his brother Hector whom he has never seen eye to eye with very much because they both fancied the beautiful Kate Cameron when they were young.

== Cast ==
- Gregor Fisher as Hector Robertson
- James Fleet as Frank Robertson
- Caroline Langrishe as Kate Robertson
