= Red Kingdom Rising =

- Directed by: Navin Dev
- Written by: Navin Dev
- Produced by: Navin Dev
- Starring: Emily Stride; David Caron; Silvana Maimone; Etalia Turnbull
- Cinematography: Jamie Havill
- Edited by: Guillem Serrano
- Music by: Martin Thornton
- Production company: 1406 Pictures Ltd
- Release dates: 5 September 2012 (Portobello Film Festival); 28 April 2014
- Running time: 73 minutes
- Country: United Kingdom
- Language: English

Red Kingdom Rising is a 2012 independent fantasy horror film written, produced and directed by Navin Dev. The film is inspired by Lewis Carroll's 1865 novel Alice's Adventures in Wonderland and its 1871 sequel Through the Looking Glass. It marks Dev's first feature-length film, following on from his similarly themed fairy tale short films.

== Plot ==
Mary Ann has been tormented her whole life by dreams of a sinister figure called the Red King and his morbid fairytale kingdom. Following the death of her father, she returns to her family home where she recalls the childhood stories of the Red King and Alice from Alice's Adventures in Wonderland that her father once read to her. Within the decaying and neglected state of the gothic family house, Mary Ann soon discovers that her once highly religious and abusive mother is now secretly engaging in black magic.

A brutal bewitching attack from her mother propels Mary Ann into the twisted, fairy tale dream world of the Red King. In this dream world Mary Ann encounters an unlikely guide in the form of a mysterious, Cheshire Cat masked little girl calling herself Alice. Alice prompts Mary Ann to question the relevancy of the dreamscape and whether this is Mary Ann's dream or that of the Red King's.

Haunting events and emergence of suppressed memories force Mary Ann to unlock secrets of her painful childhood as she journeys through the realms of the dream world, landing in a final confrontation with the Red King. Mary Ann must face this embodiment of her childhood fears to forever gain closure to the pains and horrors of her past.

== Cast ==
- Emily Stride – Mary Ann
- David Caron – Father
- Silvana Maimone – Mother
- Etalia Turnbull – Alice

== Production ==
Director Navin Dev was inspired by real accounts of adult survivors of child abuse and wanted to portray a symbolic, nightmarish world that evoked the psychological horrors they endured. Having researched Bruno Bettelheim's The Uses of Enchantment: The Meaning and Importance of Fairy Tales, Dev set the film within the fantasy horror genre as it would enable the film to be elaborated upon the mature and symbolic themes found in fairy tales.

Carroll's Alice's Adventures in Wonderland and in particular, Through the Looking-Glass, were used as direct inspirations due to the ideas of dream reversal, occultism, and dream symbolism that Carroll presents in his work and that author Marc Edmund Jones elaborates on.

Production of Red Kingdom Rising was achieved on a low budget, with pre-production commencing months prior to shooting in order to design and build the complicated character make up prosthetics as well as a full scale Red Kingdom dream world. Dev undertook extensive rehearsals with his cast, familiarising them with affective memory exercises in order to reach the complexity of the troubled characters.

Visual inspirations for Red Kingdom Rising ranged from Gustav Dore’s fable paintings, artist Mark Ryden’s work, numerous graphic novels to Jaromil Jireš' 1970 film Valerie and Her Week of Wonders. Dev chose to shoot the film on the Super 16mm format due to its grainy and organic quality that would uphold the organic visual style of a fairy tale.

== Release ==
Red Kingdom Rising had its world premiere at the Portobello Film Festival at which it was nominated for the Best Horror Film award. It was also screened at the Gotham Screen Film Festival & Screenplay Contest in New York.

Red Kingdom Rising won Best Fantasy Horror Film at the 2014 Feratum Film Festival - Mexico's largest genre festival in fantasy, sci-fi and horror.

A Special Edition US DVD of the film containing Navin Dev's short films and a 5.1 surround sound mix of the film was released on Amazon.com on 28 April 2014 by the film's production company 1406 Pictures Ltd.

== Reception ==
An early cut of the film had a private press screening at Wilton's Music Hall in London to which acclaimed critic and Empire contributing editor Kim Newman attended. He said that the film had 'a nicely dense, imagistic feel and a grasp of the nightmarish, a study of a cracked psyche, using the tropes of scary children's stories....'

Red Kingdom Rising has received many favourable reviews, most notably from UK genre film journalist MJ Simpson who described the film as 'a hugely impressive feature debut, a visual poem reminiscent of the masters of dreamlike cinema...' and Flickering Myth who described it as 'an eerie and imaginative dark fantasy dreamscape with a visual style reminiscent of directors such as Tim Burton and Guillermo del Toro....'

Red Kingdom Rising has been featured in history books; English Gothic: Classic Horror Cinema (1897-2015) by Jonathan Rigby and The History of British Literature on Film (1895-2015) by Greg M. Colon Semenza and Robert Hasenfratz. The latter described that 'to most viewers, Joss Whedon's Much Ado won't look much different than an equally well-crafted 16mm film such as Red Kingdom Rising, Navin Dev's 2014 horror adaptation of Lewis Carroll's Alice novels.'
