= Jacques Frémontier =

French journalist (1930–2020)

- Born: Jacques Friedman; 8 May 1930; Paris, France
- Died: 7 April 2020 (aged 89); Paris, France
- Occupation: Journalist

Jacques Frémontier (born surname Friedman; 8 May 1930 – 7 April 2020) was a French journalist and television producer.

== Biography ==
Jacques Frémontier, born Friedman, was Jewish and came from an Ashkenazi Jewish family of merchants of which he was the only son. His father specialized in mail order sales on credit. He grew up on Rue du Temple in The Marais, Paris. During Vichy France and Occupation, his family escaped in 1940 to Lot-et-Garonne, in Villeneuve-sur-Lot, where he was hidden by a couple of grocers, to avoid the Vichy anti-Jewish legislation.

After the liberation of Paris, Frémontier entered the Lycée Louis-le-Grand. He then attended Sciences Po and the École nationale d'administration, which he left after two years.

Frémontier began working for L'Express in 1954, where he wrote sections dedicated to literature, cinema, and theatre. He then left for Franc-Tireur, where he covered the activity of the French Parliament. The newspaper was bought by Cino Del Duca in 1957, causing Frémontier to join Paris-Jour, where he was appointed editor-in-chief of political news. He served as editor-in-chief of Paris-Presse from 1961 to 1965, and then returned to Paris-Jour as director. He closely followed the events of May 68, and detailed the actions of the strikers in the newspaper. He left journalistic life in 1969.

In 1969, Frémontier joined the Office de Radiodiffusion Télévision Française (ORTF) thanks to his friendship with leaders such as Jacques-Bernard Dupont, Claude Contamine, and Jacques Thibaud. He produced the series Vivre aujourd'hui from 1970 to 1973, where he worked with journalists such as Daniel Karlin, Michel Pamart, Paul Seban, and Marcel Trillat. He then produced Vivre ensemble with some of his former collaborators.

Frémontier often called for open, democratic public television, supporting the beliefs of the French Communist Party, of which he was a member.[8] In 1975, he published the book Vive la Télévision, Messieurs!, in which he wrote about his experiences in producing television programs.

He carried out a sociological survey, titled La Forteresse Ouvrière: Renault, which he carried out at the Renault factory in Boulogne-Billancourt. It was published in 1971. He completed his doctoral thesis in 2000, supervised by Nancy L. Green, and titled Les Juifs communistes en France depuis 1945 : essai d'histoire orale.

Frémontier married Michèle Lagneau, who was a Knight of the Legion of Honour, in 1997. He died on 7 April 2020 at the Hôpital Cochin, in Paris due to COVID-19 at the age of 89.

== Books ==
- La Colonie (1967)
- La Forteresse ouvrière : Renault (1971)
- Vive la télévision, Messieurs! (1975)
- Portugal, Les points sur les i (1976)
- La Vie en bleu, Voyage en culture ouvrière (1980)
- Pied de guerre (1982)
- Les Cadets de la Droite (1984)
- L'Étoile rouge de David : Les juifs communistes en France (2002)
- Le Nom et la Peau (2004)
- La femme proscrite qui m'a sauvé la vie (2014)

== Audiograms ==
- Musée d'art de d'histoire du Judaïsme
- Le témoin du vendredi : Jacques Frémontier, réalisateur historique et blogueur octogénaire (2019)
