= Refrigerator mother theory =

Discredited historical theory about the cause of autism spectrum disorders

The refrigerator mother theory, also known as Bettelheim's theory of autism, is a discredited psychological theory that the cause of autism is a lack of parental, and in particular, maternal emotional warmth. Evidence against the refrigerator mother theory began in the late 1970s, with twin studies suggesting a genetic etiology, as well as non-social environmental factors. Modern research generally agrees that there is a largely epigenetic etiology of autism spectrum disorders.

The terms refrigerator mother and refrigerator parents were coined around 1950 as a label for mothers or fathers of children diagnosed with autism or schizophrenia. Both terms are now regarded as stigmatizing and no longer used.

== Origins of theory ==
In his 1943 paper that first identified autism, Leo Kanner called attention to what appeared to him as a lack of warmth among the fathers and mothers of autistic children. In a 1949 paper, Kanner suggested that autism may be related to a "Maternal lack of genuine warmth", noted that fathers rarely stepped down to indulge in children's play, and observed that children were exposed from "the beginning to parental coldness, obsessiveness, and a mechanical type of attention to material needs only.... They were left neatly in refrigerators which did not defrost. Their withdrawal seems to be an act of turning away from such a situation to seek comfort in solitude." In a 1960 interview, Kanner bluntly described parents of autistic children as "just happening to defrost enough to produce a child".

Bruno Bettelheim at the University of Chicago was instrumental in facilitating its widespread acceptance both by the public and the medical establishment. Bettelheim was hired in 1944 to be the director of the Orthogenic School for Troubled Children at the University of Chicago as a residential treatment milieu for such children, who he felt would benefit from a "parentectomy". This marked the apex of autism viewed as a disorder of parenting.

Bettelheim later expounded his theories about autism in his 1967 book Empty Fortress: Infantile Autism and the Birth of the Self. In it, he compared autism to being a prisoner in a concentration camp:

The difference between the plight of prisoners in a concentration camp and the conditions which lead to autism and schizophrenia in children is, of course, that the child has never had a previous chance to develop much of a personality.

In the 1950s and 1960s, in the absence of any biomedical explanation of autism's cause after the telltale symptoms were first described by scientists, Bettelheim, as well as some psychoanalysts, championed the notion that autism was the product of mothers who were cold, distant and rejecting, thus depriving their children of the chance to "bond properly".

The theory was embraced by the medical establishment and went largely unchallenged into the mid-1960s, but its effects have lingered into the 21st century. Many articles and books published in that era blamed autism on a maternal lack of affection, but by 1964, Bernard Rimland, a psychologist who had an autistic son, published a book that signaled the emergence of a counter-explanation to the established misconceptions about the causes of autism. His book, Infantile Autism: The Syndrome and its Implications for a Neural Theory of Behavior, attacked the refrigerator mother hypothesis directly.

In 1969, Kanner addressed the refrigerator mother issue at the first annual meeting of what is now the Autism Society of America, stating:

From the very first publication until the last, I spoke of this condition in no uncertain terms as "innate." But because I described some of the characteristics of the parents as persons, I was misquoted often as having said that "it is all the parents' fault."

== Leo Kanner's changing views ==
According to the book In a Different Key: The Story of Autism (2016), Leo Kanner's original 1943 paper stated that "the child's aloneness" was evident "from the very beginning of life". Furthermore, he drew a contrast between autism and schizophrenia, in that autism was part of a child's constitution whereas schizophrenia developed later in life.

This first paper drew only a handful of citations in the medical literature. The condition he described was not talked about by a single newspaper or magazine article. In addition, clinicians in other parts of the world were not confirming what Kanner had seen, so through approximately 1950, virtually all cases of autism were diagnosed by Kanner himself.

Kanner engaged in lengthy conversation by mail with Louise Despert, who was a New York psychiatrist he held in high esteem. Kanner defended his theories whereas Despert maintained that he had not observed anything other than child schizophrenia. When Kanner next revised his textbook, he moved autism to the schizophrenia category although he placed it in a subheading.

In a 2016 paper entitled "Correcting the Record: Leo Kanner and Autism", Drs. James Harris and Joseph Piven maintain that Kanner did not go through a middle period in which he blamed parents. Instead, Kanner was describing characteristics of the parents which would later be viewed as part of the broader autism phenotype. For example, in a 1956 paper Kanner and a co-author wrote, "If one considers the personalities of the parents who have been described as successfully autistic, the possibility suggests itself that they may represent milder manifestations and that the children show the full emergence of the latent structure." In addition, the early 1940s was still a period when eugenics was held in respect, and in the United States, sterilization of people with intellectual disability was legal. Furthermore, this was a period in which psychoanalysis with its emphasis on early life experiences was the dominant view among the clinical and scientific establishment. In addition, if autism was in fact caused by negative parenting, that would seem to offer more hope for treatment of the child and/or family.

In 1949 Kanner published his third major paper on autism. According to In a Different Key, he began to blame cold mothering. Whereas previously he had positive things to say about Donald Triplett's mother Mary, now he painted a picture in which Mary appeared "cold". And he portrayed parents in general as being at least partially to blame for the autistic characteristics of their children.

Blaming parents, and in particular blaming mothers, seemed to resonate with broader society. For example, after Kanner blamed mothers, Time magazine wanted to write about autism. Kanner viewed 1951 as a turning point for the wider understanding of autism. Within ten years, some fifty-two articles and one book had been published by a variety of thinkers and clinicians. Autism also began to be diagnosed overseas, first in Holland and then elsewhere.

In the hardcover version of In a Different Key (2016), authors John Donvan and Caren Zucker state "Kanner, instead of sticking by his initial conviction about autism being inborn, had flinched." The authors further state that "the refrigerator-mother myth was set loose upon the world for many years to come."

In a 1969 speech at a U.S. convention for parents with children on the autism spectrum, Kanner said, "Herewith, I officially acquit you people as parents." However, in the 1979 edition of his textbook Child Psychiatry, he states that childhood schizophrenia (a phrase often used for autism until the 1970s) was more closely correlated with parental attitudes than with a person's genetic background.

== Other notable psychiatrists ==
For Silvano Arieti, who wrote his major works from the 1950s through the 1970s, the terms autistic thought and what he called paleologic thought are apparently the same phenomenon. Paleologic thought is a characteristic in both present-day people with schizophrenia and primitive men, a type of thinking that has its foundations in non-Aristotelian logic. An autistic child speaks of himself as "you" and not infrequently of the mother as "I". The "you" remains a "you" and is not transformed into "I".

For Margaret Mahler and her colleagues, autism is a defense of children who cannot experience the mother as the living primary-object. According to them, autism is an attempt at dedifferentiation and deanimation. The symbiotic autistic syndrome used to be called the "Mahler syndrome" because Mahler first described it: The child is unable to differentiate from the mother.

Arieti warned that an autistic tendency is a sign of a kind of disorder in the process of socialization, and that when autistic expressions appear it should be assumed that there is a sort of difficulty between the child and his parents, especially the schizogenic mother. Children who use autistic expressions, Arieti observes, are children who cannot bond socially.

In Interpretation of Schizophrenia (1955) Arieti maintained that for a normal process of socialization, it is necessary for the parent-child relations to be normal. Loving or non-anxiety parental attitudes favor socialization. Arieti not only maintained that the parent-child relations are the first social act and the major drive of socialization, but also a stimulus to either accept or reject society. The child's self in this view is a reflection of the sentiments, thoughts, and attitudes of the parents toward the child. Autistic children show an extreme socializing disorder and do not want any sort of relationship with people. They "eliminate" people from their consciousness. For Arieti the fear of the parents is extended to other adults: a tendency to cut off communication with human beings.

== Persistence of the theory ==
According to Peter Breggin's 1991 book Toxic Psychiatry, the psychogenic theory of autism was abandoned because of political pressure from parents' organizations, not for scientific reasons. For example, some case reports have shown that profound institutional privation can result in quasi-autistic symptoms. Clinician Frances Tustin devoted her life to the theory. She wrote:

One must note that autism is one of a number of children's neurological disorders of psychogenic nature, i.e., caused by abusive and traumatic treatment of infants. ...There is persistent denial by American society of the causes of damage to millions of children who are thus traumatized and brain damaged as a consequence of cruel treatment by parents who are otherwise too busy to love and care for their babies.

Alice Miller, one of the best-known authors of the consequences of child abuse, has maintained that autism is psychogenic, and that fear of the truth about child abuse is the leitmotif of nearly all forms of autistic therapy known to her. When Miller visited several autism therapy centers in the United States, it became apparent to her that the stories of children "inspired fear in both doctors and mothers alike":

I spent a day observing what happened to the group. I also studied close-ups of children on video. What became clearer and clearer as the day went on was that all these children had a serious history of suffering behind them. This, however, was never referred to....In my conversations with the therapists and mothers, I inquired about the life stories of individual children. The facts confirmed my hunch. No one, however, was willing to take these facts seriously.

Like Arieti and Tustin, Miller believes that only empathetic parental attitudes lead to the complete blossoming of the child's personality.

== Modern understanding of autism ==
The modern consensus is that autism has a strong genetic basis, although the genetics of autism are complex and are not well understood. Moreover, fetal and infant exposure to pesticides, viruses, and household chemicals have also been implicated as triggering the syndrome.

Although recent studies have indicated that parental warmth, praise, and quality of relationship are associated with reductions of behavior problems in autistic adolescents and adults, and that parental criticisms are associated with maladaptive behaviors and symptoms, these ideas are distinct from the refrigerator mother hypothesis.

When they are infants and toddlers, children on the autism spectrum do not on average differ in attachment behavior from other infants and toddlers. For the subset of autistic infants who display "disorganized attachment", this may be more readily explained by intellectual disability than by the behavior of the parents.

The fact that autism is primarily a genetic disorder suggests Bettelheim's observations may have been accurate while his attribution were not. One or both parents of autistic children are more likely to be autistic than the parents of typical children. Some characteristics common in autistic people, some of which are necessary for the diagnosis, are inconsistent with being a warm parent who anticipates the needs of their infant. Yet autism in the child is likely due to the genetic predisposition rather than the impact of being raised by autistic parents. Thus Bettelheim may have been half correct. Autistic children are more likely to have a parent who seems cold or distant but that is not the cause of the child's autism.

== Documentary film ==
In 2002, Kartemquin Films released Refrigerator Mothers, a documentary that takes a look at American mothers of the 1950s and 1960s and the blame leveled by the medical establishment for the mothers causing their children's autism. The premiere was broadcast in the summer of 2002 by United States' PBS, which the PBS website has described as "Though wholly discredited today, the 'refrigerator mother' diagnosis condemned thousands of autistic children to questionable therapies, and their mothers to a long nightmare of self-doubt and guilt. In Refrigerator Mothers, the new film by David E. Simpson, J. J. Hanley and Gordon Quinn, and a Kartemquin Educational Films production, these mothers tell their story for the first time."

== See also ==
- Maternal deprivation
- Pit of despair, an apparatus used in social isolation experiments on infant rhesus macaques
- Autism in psychoanalysis
- Wire mother, an apparatus used in monkey experiments
