= The Uses of Enchantment =

1976 book by Bruno Bettelheim

- Cover of the first edition
- Author: Bruno Bettelheim
- Language: English
- Subject: Fairy tales
- Publisher: Thames & Hudson
- Publication date: 1976
- Publication place: United States
- Media type: Print (Hardcover and Paperback)
- Pages: 352
- ISBN: 978-0-14-013727-9
- Dewey Decimal: 398.45
- LC Class: GR550 .B47

The Uses of Enchantment: The Meaning and Importance of Fairy Tales is a 1976 book by Bruno Bettelheim, in which the author analyzes fairy tales in terms of Freudian psychoanalysis. In 1991, the book became a subject of controversy regarding possible plagiarism.

== Structure and contents ==
The book is divided into two main sections. The first, "A Pocketful of Magic," outlines Bettelheim's thoughts on the value of fairy tales for children. The second part, "In Fairy Land," presents psychoanalytical readings of 10 popular fairy tales, specifically:

- "Hansel and Gretel"
- "Little Red Riding Hood"
- "Jack and the Beanstalk"
- "Snow White"
- "Goldilocks and the Three Bears"
- "The Sleeping Beauty"
- "Cinderella"
- The "animal bridegroom" cycle of fairy tales:
  - "Beauty and the Beast"
  - "The Frog Prince"
  - "Bluebeard"

Bettelheim presents a case that fairy tales help children solve certain existential problems such as separation anxiety, oedipal conflict, and sibling rivalries. The extreme violence and ugly emotions of many fairy tales serve to deflect what may well be going on in the child's mind anyway. A child's unrealistic fears often require unrealistic hopes. And furthermore, "The Frog King" may be superior to modern sex education in that it acknowledges that a child may find sex disgusting, and this may serve a protective function for the child.

In his introduction, Bettelheim stated that he was writing the book as "an educator and therapist of severely disturbed children." However, after his death, his credentials in those fields were found to be faked, and Bettelheim had only taken three introductory classes in psychology.

== Reception and influence ==
In the U.S., Bettelheim and The Uses of Enchantment won the 1976 National Book Critics Circle Award for Criticism and the 1977 National Book Award in category Contemporary Thought.

Robert A. Segal writes, "It is the disjunction between Bettelheim's up-to-date approach to fairy tales and his old-fashioned approach to myths that is striking."

The Uses of Enchantment has been cited as an influence in many subsequent works that utilize fairy tales in adult terms, including the 1987 film Dolls, the 2011 Catherine Hardwicke film Red Riding Hood and the 2014 fantasy horror film Red Kingdom Rising.

The Uses of Enchantment was discussed by Stanley Kubrick and Diane Johnson during the writing of script for The Shining (1980).

== Plagiarism ==
In the Winter 1991 issue of the Journal of American Folklore, a peer-reviewed publication, Alan Dundes, then a 28-year veteran of the anthropology department at the University of California, presented evidence that Bruno Bettelheim had copied substantial portions from A Psychiatric Study of Myths and Fairy Tales: Their Origin, Meaning, and Usefulness by Julius Heuscher without proper attribution. Dundes also cited instances of unacknowledged borrowing from other sources.

Dundes states that Bettelheim engaged in "wholesale borrowing" of both "random passages" and "key ideas," primarily from Heuscher's book, but also from other sources. Robert A. Georges, a Professor of Folklore at the University of California, Los Angeles, stated "it is clear [Bettelheim] didn't do his homework."

Heuscher, however, appeared untroubled by the matter. He said, "We all plagiarize. I plagiarize. Many times, I am not sure whether it came out of my own brain or if it came from somewhere else … I'm only happy that I would have influenced Bruno Bettelheim. I did not always agree with him. But that does not matter. Poor Bruno Bettelheim. I would not want to disturb his eternal sleep with this."

Dundes also claimed that Bettelheim had copied material from his own 1967 article on the folk tale Cinderella. However, Jacquelyn Sanders—who knew Bettelheim personally and later held the same position he once did as director of the Orthogenic School at the University of Chicago—expressed scepticism about the accusation. In 1991, she remarked: “I would not call that plagiarism. I think the article is a reasonable scholarly endeavour, and calling it scholarly etiquette is appropriate. It is appropriate that this man deserved to be acknowledged and Bettelheim didn't … But I would not fail a student for doing that, and I don't know anybody who would.”

In reviewing a biography of Bettelheim by Richard Pollak in 1997, Sarah Boxer of The New York Times said Richard Pollak "gives a damning passage-for-passage comparison" of the two books.

Concerns about Bettelheim’s borrowings had already surfaced in 1991. The Los Angeles Times drew attention to striking similarities between Heuscher’s writing and Bettelheim’s later work. Heuscher had written: "While one must never ‘explain’ the fairy tales to the child, the narrator’s understanding of their meaning is very important. It furthers the sensitivity for selecting those stories which are most appropriate in various phases of children’s development and for stressing those themes which may be therapeutic for specific psychological difficulties."

And Bettelheim had subsequently written: "One must never ‘explain’ to the child the meaning of fairy tales. However, the narrator’s understanding of the fairy tale’s message to the child’s preconscious mind is important. . . . It furthers the adult’s sensitivity to selection of those stories which are most appropriate to the child’s state of development and to the specific psychological difficulties he is confronted with at the moment."
