= Tony Humphreys =

Irish psychologist and writer

Tony Humphreys is an Irish educator, a consultant clinical psychologist, the founder of the Relationship Mentoring modality of Psychotherapy and the author of eleven self-help books translated into 15 languages and available in 28 countries. They notably include A Different Kind of Teacher, Self-esteem: the Key to your Child's Future (1995), The Power of "Negative" Thinking (1996), Children Feeling Good (1998) and ‘'Relationship, Relationship, Relationship: The Heart of a Mature Society'’ (2010).

Humphreys is a parent-mentor and motivational speaker. He regularly wrote about psychology and illness in the Irish Times and in the Irish Examiner, where he contributed a psychology column for over ten years until 2012 when it ceased. At that time he wrote a controversial article on autism. The Irish Examiner removed the article from its website because “Tony Humphreys’ assertions made in the article are not supported by the vast body of published research in the field of Autistic Spectrum Disorders and are unhelpful and likely to cause upset”.

He believes strongly in the impact of unconditional love, or its absence, on physical health. He is the Director of a number of courses in Parent Mentoring, Interpersonal Communication and Relationship Studies at University College Cork and at All Hallows College, Drumcondra, Dublin.

== Early life and education ==
Upbringing left a significant psychological imprint on Tony Humphreys and on his philosophy. He was "constantly and unfavourably compared with his twin brother" and sought approval by assuming the role of carer for his invalided mother. He left school at fifteen and joined a monastery at eighteen for a period of 7 years. He left the monastery a month before taking his vows "having lost all belief in Catholicism" immediately left his devoutly religious family, who had rejected him. He sought alternative spirituality and put himself through night school to obtain a degree and higher diploma in Physical Education, followed by an MA in 1977 and PhD in 1983 in Psychology.

== Refrigerator mother theory ==
Tony Humphreys promotes the Refrigerator mother theory of the aetiology of autistic behaviours first popularised by Bruno Bettelheim, and does not believe in the existence of the clinical manifestations known as autism or autistic spectrum disorder (ASD). His published opinions have drawn vociferous complaints from the Minister for Health and Children, James Reilly, from groups representing families affected by autism and a censure calling for retraction from the Psychological Society of Ireland and his retirement by members of ICAAN (The Irish Council for Aspies and Autistic Networking). He continues to maintain that frigid parenting – conscious, subconscious or unconscious – is the root cause of 'autistic' behavioural issues in the family. The Press Ombudsman of Ireland adjudicated that "the offence was not only widespread but grave, could have been interpreted as gratuitously provocative, and might have been avoided or at least minimized if the topic had been presented in a different manner".

Humphreys has taken the Refrigerator Mother theory further than others, with claims that abuse and emotional neglect are the cause of schizophrenia and a range of other childhood behaviours that are 'labelled' as medical disorders, including oppositional-defiant disorder (ODD), attention-deficit disorder (ADD), attention-deficit hyperactivity disorder (ADHD), dyspraxia and dyslexia in addition to ASDs. He believes that these 'labelled disorders' are avoidant behavioural adjustments that enable a threatened child "to survive in a painful world of conditionality" and are curable through "unconditionally valuing and caring" relationships. He has made similar claims for emotionally challenging environments causing the onset of asthma. Both professional and advocate groups have decried his theory of the aetiology of schizophrenia.

== Books ==
- Humphreys, Tony (1995). A Different Kind of Teacher, Self-esteem the Key to your Child's Future. Dublin: Gill & Macmillan. ISBN 978-0-7171-3790-9.
- Humphreys, Tony (1996). The Power of "Negative" Thinking. Dublin: Gill & Macmillan. ISBN 978-0-7171-2443-5.
- Humphreys, Tony (1998a). A Different Kind of Discipline. Dublin: Gill & Macmillan. ISBN 978-0-7171-2807-5.
- Humphreys, Tony (1998b). Children Feeling Good. Dublin: Veritas. ISBN 978-1-85390-374-8.
- Humphreys, Tony (2000). Work and Worth: Take Back Your Life. Dublin: Gill & Macmillan. ISBN 978-0-7171-3122-8.
- Humphreys, Tony (2002). Self-Esteem, The Key to Your Child's Future. Dublin: Gill & Macmillan. ISBN 978-0-7171-2990-4.
- Humphreys, Tony (2003). Whose Life are you Living?. Dublin: Gill & Macmillan. ISBN 978-0-7171-3662-9.
- Humphreys, Tony (2004a). All About Children, Questions Parents Ask. Dublin: Gill & Macmillan. ISBN 978-0-7171-3740-4.
- Humphreys, Tony (2004b). Leaving The Nest. Dublin: Gill & Macmillan. ISBN 978-0-7171-3734-3.
- Humphreys, Tony (2005). Myself, My Partner. Dublin: Gill & Macmillan. ISBN 978-0-7171-3914-9.

== See also ==
- Autism
- Autistic spectrum disorder
- Asperger's syndrome
