= Night of Too Many Stars =

Fundraising telethon for autism

Night of Too Many Stars is a fundraising telethon for autism. It has been held every two or three years since 2003. The event was founded by Robert Smigel after learning that his son was diagnosed with autism. Comedian Jon Stewart often hosts the show.

== Events ==
=== 2012 ===
The 2012 event aired on October 21, 2012 on Comedy Central and was held at the Beacon Theatre in New York City.

Auctions included:

- Seth Rogen auctioned off being able to use the restroom next to him.
- Jodi DiPiazza performed a duet with Katy Perry
- Louis C.K. auctioned off the ability to have your Christmas card or Hanukkah card picture taken with Al Pacino. C.K. ended up taking a Christmas photo with Stewart and Pacino.
- Bill Burr performed some stand-up comedy.

Jon Stewart introduced friend and frequent sparring partner conservative Bill O'Reilly of FOX News, and liberal Chris Matthews of MSNBC's Hardball who agreed to have a debate onstage with the catch being they had to inhale helium balloons before answering each question. John King moderated the debate.

The event closed by Sting singing Roxanne with Jon Stewart, Louis C.K., Bill Burr, Seth Rogen, Carly Rae Jepsen, Katy Perry, Hannibal Buress, J. B. Smoove, Tom Morello, Paul Reps, Harvey Keitel and Jodi DiPiazza.

=== 2015 ===
The 2015 event aired on Comedy Central on March 8, but was taped a week earlier. It was two hours long and held at the Beacon Theatre.

Jodi DiPiazza performed a duet with "Weird Al" Yankovic.

Adam Sandler and Bob Barker did a skit in which they had brawl that served as a follow-up to the one in Happy Gilmore. This skit ended with them dying from deliberate Ebola infection and continuing to fight in heaven - with Abraham Lincoln, Chubbs Peterson (again played by Carl Weathers), and the alligator that took Chubbs hand looking on.

=== 2017 ===
The 2017 event at the Theater at Madison Square Garden was broadcast live by HBO on 18 November. Louis C.K. was scheduled to appear on the show but was dropped by HBO following his misconduct allegations against him. Jon Stewart hosted the show.

- In the opening monologue, Olivia Munn, Howie Mandel, Michael J. Fox, Robert De Niro, John Oliver, Stephen Colbert, and Billy Crystal made appearances.
- Adam Sandler sang a song in his distinctive funny voice.
- John Mulaney did a standup routine
- Abbi Jacobson and Illana Glazer did a comedy bit Skyping Sesame Street characters and Lin-Manuel Miranda.
- Steve Carell, Andy Samberg, Jon Lovitz appeared in a pre-taped sketch.
- Gayle King spoke about the needs of autistic children and introduced Carly Fleischmann.
- Fleischmann, an autistic woman who hosts the first non-verbal talk show Speechless with Carly Fleischmann, interviewed Stephen Colbert
- Chris Rock did a comedy routine
- Ben Stiller did Q&A segment with the audience
- Michelle Wolf performed stand up
- Ellie Kemper took donations from the audience
- J. J. Abrams auctioned
- Hasan Minhaj performed stand up
- Kumail Nanjiani, Bob Newhart, James Marsden, Sarah Silverman also appeared in pre-taped sketches
- Jodi DiPiazza performed a duet with Cynthia Erivo and The Roots, Jon Stewart and Howie Mandel.
