= In a Different Key =

Book by John Donvan

- First edition
- Authors: John Donvan; Caren Zucker
- Language: English
- Genre: Narrative nonfiction
- Publisher: Broadway Books
- Publication date: January 19, 2016
- Publication place: United States
- Media type: Print (Hardcover)
- Pages: 690 pp.
- Awards: 2017 Pulitzer Prize for General Nonfiction finalist
- ISBN: 978-0-307-98567-5 (Hardcover)

In a Different Key: The Story of Autism is a 2016 non-fiction book by John Donvan and Caren Zucker. It discusses the history of autism and autism advocacy, including issues such as the refrigerator mother theory and the possibility of an autism epidemic. Donald Triplett, the first person diagnosed with autism, and psychiatrist Leo Kanner are also covered, as is the ongoing debate concerning the neurodiversity movement, especially with respect to autistic people with more apparent support needs.

== Summary ==
The book starts by focusing on Donald Triplett, the first recorded child to be diagnosed with autism. It discusses how he was treated and his family life. The book continues with the refrigerator mother theory, which claimed that parents were the main cause of autism. Leo Kanner and Bruno Bettelheim's role in the formation of this theory is examined, with emphasis on Kanner's position vis à vis the refrigerator mother. The authors discuss the importance of redefining the disorder so that more people with autism can receive treatment and improve their quality of life. After looking at the beginnings of modern autism research, how autism is defined, and whether the disorder is a benefit or a deficit, the authors close the book with discussion of the increase in public knowledge about autism, the MMR vaccine controversy, and the neurodiversity debate.

== Reception ==
Kirkus Reviews wrote that the book was compelling and well-researched, and the authors blended the search for treatment with the personal stories of various individuals. Spectrum wrote that the book provided a meticulous, absorbing stepwise chronology of how the perception of autism changed from being unknown to being abhorred, then later accepted. Ari Ne'eman has criticized the book for sympathizing with a parent who murdered their autistic child, and has claimed that the book misrepresents the neurodiversity movement.

=== Awards ===
In a Different Key was a finalist for the 2017 Pulitzer Prize for General Nonfiction, described by the reviewers as "a passionate work of advocacy that traces public perceptions about autism from chillingly cruel beginnings to a kinder but still troubling present."

=== Adaptation ===
In a Different Key was adapted into a documentary in 2022.
