= A Psychiatric Study of Myths and Fairy Tales: Their Origin, Meaning, and Usefulness =

1963 book by Julius E. Heuscher (revised 1974)

A Psychiatric Study of Fairy Tales: Their Origin, Meaning, and Usefulness
- Author: Julius Ernest Heuscher
- Language: English
- Genre: Non-Fiction
- Publisher: Charles C. Thomas
- Publication date: 1963, 1974
- Publication place: US
- Media type: Hardcover
- Pages: 224 pp
- ISBN: 0398028516

A Psychiatric Study of Fairy Tales: Their Origin, Meaning, and Usefulness is a 1963 (revised 1974) nonfiction book by Stanford University Psychiatrist Julius E. Heuscher (1918-2006), which explores the psychological, symbolic, and cultural significance of fairy tales. Drawing on psychoanalytic theory, existential psychology, mythology, and child development, Heuscher argues that fairy tales serve a vital role in human psychological growth and self-understanding. Rather than dismissing these stories as mere children's entertainment, he interprets them as expressions of universal emotional and spiritual truths, analogous in some ways to dreams or visions.

The book provides a comparative analysis of European and non-European fairy tales, including variants of Cinderella, Hansel and Gretel, and Sleeping Beauty, and distinguishes fairy tales from myths, legends, and fables. Heuscher also examines how fairy tales contribute to child development and emotional resilience by symbolically portraying the challenges of growing up, moral conflict, and transformation. He emphasizes their enduring relevance in a modern, rationalistic world increasingly disconnected from spiritual meaning.

== Structure and Contents ==
A Psychiatric Study of Fairy Tales: Their Origin, Meaning, and Usefulness is structured into two major thematic arcs: a theoretical foundation that integrates psychiatry and folklore, followed by interpretive case studies of well-known fairy tales. Across its 22 chapters, the book combines psychoanalytic, existential, literary, and cultural analysis to examine how fairy tales function psychologically and symbolically across cultures and eras.

=== Introduction and Definitions ===
Heuscher begins by clarifying terminology, distinguishing between fairy tales, myths, legends, fables, and epics, establishing a taxonomy that frames the ensuing analysis. He emphasizes the non-historical, symbolic nature of fairy tales and their proximity to dream logic and the unconscious.

=== Historical and Cross-Cultural Perspectives ===
The early chapters trace the oral tradition of fairy tales, their global migration, and the universality of motifs like Cinderella, which appears in hundreds of variants worldwide. Heuscher posits that this recurrence is not just due to transmission, but because fairy tales reflect archetypal human conflicts and longings.

=== Psychiatric Foundations ===
Heuscher draws on psychoanalysis (Sigmund Freud, Carl Jung), existential analysis (Viktor Frankl, Pauline Boss), and child psychiatry to explore how fairy tales mirror internal states, unresolved conflicts, and developmental milestones. He compares fairy tales to dreams, hallucinations, visions, and art, showing how they all emerge from the unconscious and use symbolic language.

=== The "Language" of the Fairy Tale ===
A substantial portion is dedicated to the symbolic "language" of fairy tales, focusing on their narrative structures, numerical symbolism (especially the number three), and the importance of ritualized repetition, archetypal figures, and moral oppositions (e.g., good vs. evil, light vs. dark).

=== Case Studies and Thematic Analyses ===
Heuscher devotes over half the book to interpretive case studies of specific fairy tales, examining how each story reflects aspects of psychological development and moral maturation:

- Hansel and Gretel – Symbolizes early separation anxiety and survival through sibling solidarity.
- Little Red Cap (Little Red Riding Hood) – Explores awakening sexuality, danger, and the role of the maternal figure.
- Snow White – Interpreted through the lens of latency, narcissism, and repressed femininity.
- Briar Rose (Sleeping Beauty) – Seen as a metaphor for adolescent awakening and unconscious life during latency.
- Rumpelstilzchen – A study in the power of naming, language, and the threat of narcissistic ego inflation.
- Amor and Psyche – Reflects on the tension between desire and spiritual maturation.

Each tale is unpacked using psychiatric, symbolic, and philosophical perspectives, with frequent reference to both Western and non-Western parallels, including Zuni, Scandinavian, Russian, and Indian traditions.

=== Final Sections ===
- Children and Fairy Tales – Explores how children respond to fairy tales emotionally and developmentally, and why the tales are crucial for healthy growth.
- Fairy Tales vs. Popular Media – Criticizes the flattening of narrative and psychological depth in television, Westerns, and mass-market crime stories.
- Conclusion: The Need for Meaning – The final chapter returns to Viktor Frankl’s "will to meaning", emphasizing that fairy tales, like dreams and myths, help the human psyche make sense of suffering, transformation, and moral order in a chaotic world.

=== Glossary, Bibliography, Index ===
Includes a detailed glossary of psychological and literary terms, a bibliography of cited works, and an index of referenced tales and themes.

== Notable Quotes ==
“Fairy tales, as well as dreams, have stimulated the interest and warmed the heart of human beings since the beginning of history.”

“We can regain the spiritual or moral impulses which can liberate our imprisoned ‘everyday Ego.’”

“Beyond the wish for security, for love, for achievement, the human being is endowed with a ‘will to meaning.’”

“Genuine fairy tale images, absorbed in early childhood, become inner strength and security in the soul of the developing youth.”

“True human development, therefore, is tied to meaningful communication with fellow human beings.”

== Connection to Bruno Bettelheim ==
In 1991, well-supported charges of plagiarism were brought against Bruno Bettelheim's The Uses of Enchantment, primarily that Bettelheim had copied from Heuscher's A Psychiatric Study of Myths and Fairy Tales.

== Title Change ==
The 1963 1st edition was titled A Psychiatric Study of Fairy Tales: Their Origin, Meaning, and Usefulness. The 1974 2nd edition was titled A Psychiatric Study of Myths and Fairy Tales: Their Origin, Meaning, and Usefulness.
