= Donald Triplett =

Banker and first diagnosed autistic person (1933–2023)

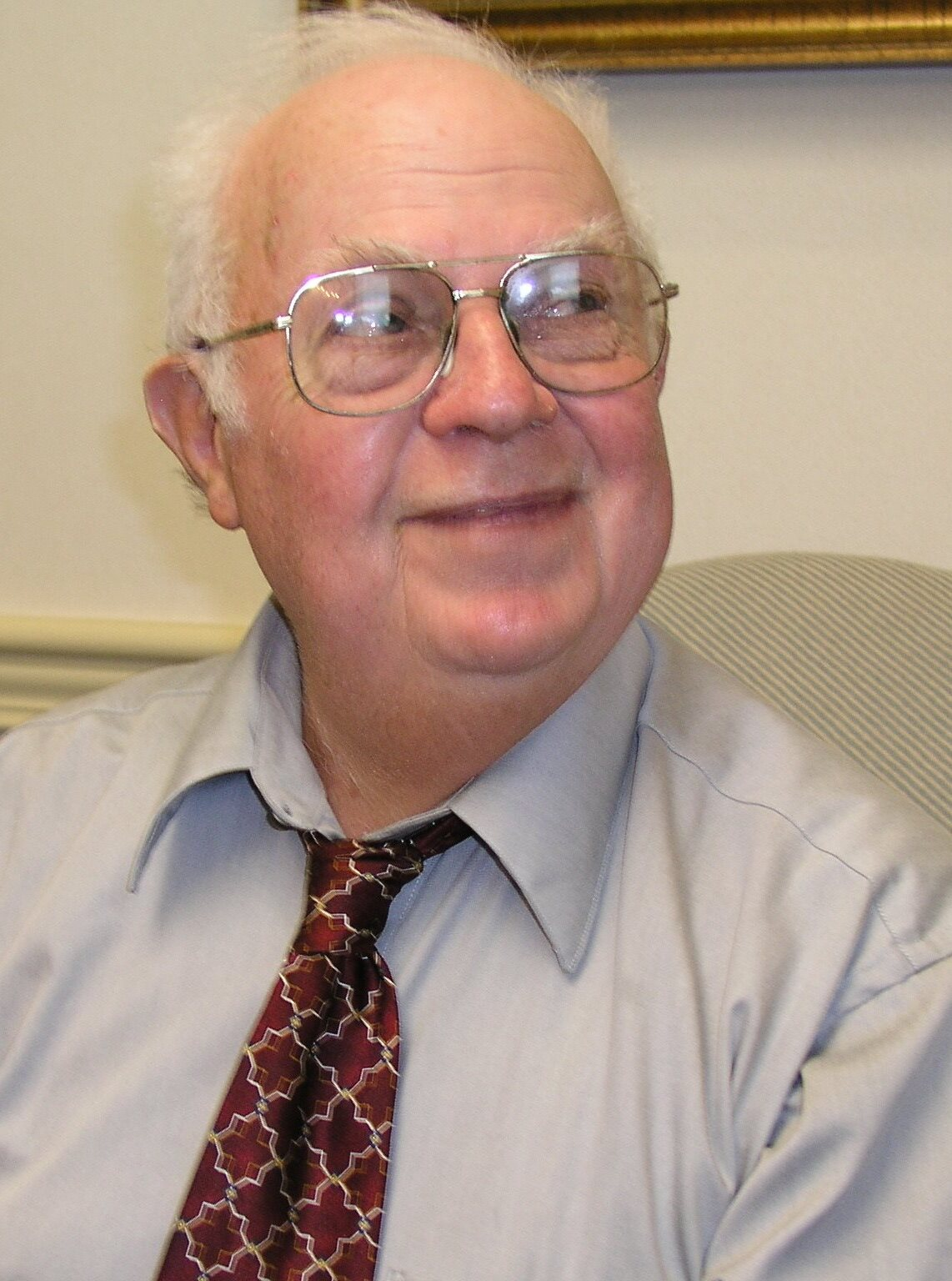
- Triplett in 2016
- Born: Donald Gray Triplett; September 8, 1933; Forest, Mississippi, U.S.
- Died: June 15, 2023 (aged 89); Forest, Mississippi, U.S.
- Occupation: Banker
- Known for: First person to be diagnosed as autistic

Donald Gray Triplett (September 8, 1933 – June 15, 2023) was an American banker known for being the first person diagnosed with autism. He was diagnosed by Leo Kanner in 1943 and was labeled as "Case 1". Triplett was noted for his savant abilities, particularly the ability to name musical notes played on a piano and the ability to perform rapid mental multiplication.

== Early life ==
Donald Gray Triplett was born on September 8, 1933, to Beamon Triplett and Mary McCravey, in Forest, Mississippi. Donald was an introverted child who did not respond to his parents' gestures or voices. He was distant from others and did not play with other children. Triplett was institutionalized at three years of age, but his parents pulled him out one year later. His father described him as socially withdrawn but interested in number patterns, music notes, letters of the alphabet, and pictures of U.S. presidents. His father recalled that, at the age of one, "he could hum and sing many tunes accurately". His parents had difficulty in getting him to eat. By the age of two, he had the ability to recite Psalm 23 in the Old Testament and memorized 25 questions and answers from a Presbyterian catechism. At Christmas that year, he sang, with perfect intonation, an entire song he had heard only once.

Triplett was interested in rhymes and would give one-word answers to questions—usually "yes" or "no". He developed an interest in spinning blocks, pans and other round objects, and a dislike for tricycles and swings. He was initially uninterested in slides but began to play on them when he was alone. He had many meltdowns and was afraid of being spanked. He was, however, unable to associate his meltdowns with the punishment. He displayed echolalia and reversed pronouns—often using "you" to refer to himself and "I" to refer to the person to whom he was speaking. Upon entering a room, he went to the toys right away, ignoring the other people present in the room—including other children and a Santa Claus actor his father had hired. His mother had difficulty getting him to look at her.

When the Tripletts visited the Harriet Lane Home in October 1938 to meet with Austrian-American psychiatrist Leo Kanner, he was eventually diagnosed as autistic. Donald had multiple visits, but when he returned, he did not even look at the three physicians present, even though two remembered him from the previous visit. He instead headed to the desk to handle papers and books. Kanner started conversations to view his "obsessive nature". He also asked him subtraction questions to which Donald replied "I'll draw a hexagon."

When he returned home, his behavior improved, and he learned to play simple tunes on the piano. He showed better concentration and responded more clearly to his environment and other people. However, he still had meltdowns and displayed some disconcerting behavior such as standing on tables, putting food in his hair, chewing on paper, and putting house keys in the drain. He learned fifteen words from an encyclopedia and recited them repeatedly without context. He continued to not look at people when talking or use expressive gestures. He would communicate only when he needed something; once his needs were met, he would cease further communication. He became interested in categorizing film and Time magazine issues by date of publication despite having little interest in the actual contents.

== Later life and death ==
The diagnosis of Triplett was the first event in the history of autism, which later involved many conflicts among autism specialists and advocates.

From there, the history of autism would unfold across decades, playing out in many and varied dramatic episodes, bizarre twists, and star turns, both heroic and villainous, by researchers, educators, activists and autistic people themselves.

— John Donvan and Caren Zucker, BBC Magazine

However, Triplett and his family were distant from all this. He was enrolled in the local high school, where his teachers and classmates were accepting. In 1958, he graduated with a bachelor's degree in mathematics and French from Millsaps College. Later, he returned to his supportive hometown, where he worked for 65 years at Bank of Forest, a local bank that was partially owned by his father.

Triplett played golf daily. In 2020, the Mississippi Young Bankers permanently named their annual golf tournament in his honor. Triplett also played the piano impressively. He learned how to drive an automobile in his late 20s and traveled abroad in his spare time, visiting 40 foreign countries and 28 U.S states. His interactions with people included giving them nicknames and shooting rubber bands at them. He lived alone in the large house that he grew up in and later inherited. He never married and had no children. He died of cancer at home on June 15, 2023, at the age of 89.

== Legacy ==
John Donvan and Caren Zucker interviewed Triplett, chronicling his life story for an article "Autism's First Child" in The Atlantic. He was later featured in the book In a Different Key (2016), which was later adapted into a documentary for PBS. His family members say that his life "offers hope to parents".
