= Winnicott =

Winnicott is a surname. Notable people with the surname include:

- Clare Winnicott (1906–1984), an English social worker, civil servant, psychoanalyst, and teacher
- Donald Winnicott (1896–1971), an English pediatrician and psychoanalyst
- Russell Winnicott (1898–1917), an English aviator
