= Richard Pollak =

American journalist (died 2025)

Richard Pollak (died December 27, 2025) was an American journalist. He was the founding editor of More magazine.
