= John Donvan =

American journalist, author, moderator (b. 1955)

- Born: 1955 (age 70–71)
- Education: Dartmouth College (BA); Columbia School of Journalism (MSc)
- Occupations: Author; news correspondent; filmmaker; debate moderator
- Years active: 1977–present
- Spouse: Ranit Mishori
- Children: 2

John Donvan (born 1955) is an American journalist, filmmaker, and debate moderator. He is known for hosting the Open to Debate series broadcast on NPR, for his work as a long-time correspondent and anchor for ABC News, and for his writing, reporting, and documentary filmmaking on the history of autism.

== Early life ==
Donvan attended Regis High School in New York City. He attended Dartmouth and Columbia School of Journalism.

== Career ==
Donvan is the host of Open to Debate (which began as Intelligence Squared US), and is a forum that gathers experts to debate propositions concerning serious topics of public interest in Oxford Union-style debates which may be heard on NPR, and on Fora.TV.

Donvan is an avid storyteller, having premiered his first one-man show "Lose the Kid" in Washington, D.C. in September 2013, under the auspices of SpeakeasyDC.

Earlier, he worked as a reporter for ABC News, including stints as Moscow and London correspondent and becoming the network's chief White House correspondent in January 1997 and a regular contributor to Nightline in 1998.

In 2016, Donvan and Caren Zucker, a journalist and television news producer, co-authored In a Different Key: The Story of Autism. Issues discussed include the refrigerator mother theory and the possibility of an autism epidemic. One autistic individual covered is Donald Triplett, the first child diagnosed with autism. Another person profiled is psychiatrist and autism pioneer Leo Kanner. The book discusses the debate over the neurodiversity movement, especially with respect to low-functioning autistics.

== Awards ==
Donvan's broadcast work has won four Emmy Awards, several Overseas Press Club Awards, two Cine Golden Eagles, and has been honored by the National Association of Black Journalists, the Committee of 100, and the Media Action Network for Asian-Americans. As a writer, he was a named finalist for the 2017 Pulitzer Prize for General Nonfiction for In a Different Key: The Story of Autism, and also a finalist for the 2011 National Magazine Award for his profile of Donald Triplett. Both works were co-authored with Caren Zucker.

Media offices
Preceded by Brit Hume	ABC News Chief White House Correspondent; 1996–1998	Succeeded by Sam Donaldson
