= Bruno Bettelheim =

Austrian-American writer (1903–1990)

- Bruno Bettelheim
- Born: August 28, 1903; Vienna, Austria-Hungary
- Died: March 13, 1990 (aged 86); Silver Spring, Maryland, United States
- Education: University of Vienna
- Known for: Autism research (refrigerator mother theory); The Uses of Enchantment
- Spouse(s): Gina Alstadt (1930–?; divorced); Gertrude Weinfeld (1941–1984; 3 children)
- Scientific career
- Fields: Child psychology
- Workplaces: University of Chicago; Sonia Shankman Orthogenic School; Stanford University
- Doctoral students: Benjamin Drake Wright

Bruno Bettelheim (German: [ˈbɛtl̩haɪm]; August 28, 1903 – March 13, 1990) was an Austrian-born American scholar, public intellectual and writer who spent most of his academic and clinical career in the United States. An early writer on autism, Bettelheim's work focused on the education of emotionally disturbed children, as well as Freudian psychology more generally. In the U.S., he later gained a position as professor at the University of Chicago and director of the Sonia Shankman Orthogenic School for Disturbed Children, and after 1973 taught at Stanford University.

Bettelheim's ideas, which grew out of those of Sigmund Freud, theorized that children with behavioral and emotional disorders were not born that way, and could be treated through extended psychoanalytic therapy, treatment that rejected the use of psychotropic drugs and shock therapy. During the 1960s and 1970s he had an international reputation in such fields as autism, child psychiatry, and psychoanalysis.

Some of his work was questioned after his death regarding academic credentials, patient abuse, and plagiarism, arising from a negligence of institutional oversight and pursuing work outside of the psychological community.

== Background in Austria ==
Bruno Bettelheim was born in Vienna, Austria-Hungary, on August 28, 1903. His parents were Anton Bettelheim, a white-collar worker, and Pauline Bettelheim (née Seidler). After his matriculation examination in 1921, he studied for four semesters as a non-degree student and for six semesters as a degree-seeking student at the University of Vienna. He attended lectures on philosophy, art history and German studies.

When his father died in 1927, Bettelheim left his studies to earn a living for his family. He became a partner in the lumber trading company Bettelheim & Schnitzer. On March 30, 1930, he married Regina "Gina" Altstadt. His wife took care of a troubled American child, Patsy, who lived in their home in Vienna for seven years, and who may have been on the autism spectrum. In 1936, he enrolled in philosophical disciplines at the University of Vienna again and took an interest in psychology and psychoanalysis. On February 2, 1938, he obtained a doctorate in philosophy. The title of his thesis was "Das Problem des Naturschönen und die moderne Ästhetik" (English: "The Problem of the Beautiful in Nature and Modern Aesthetics").

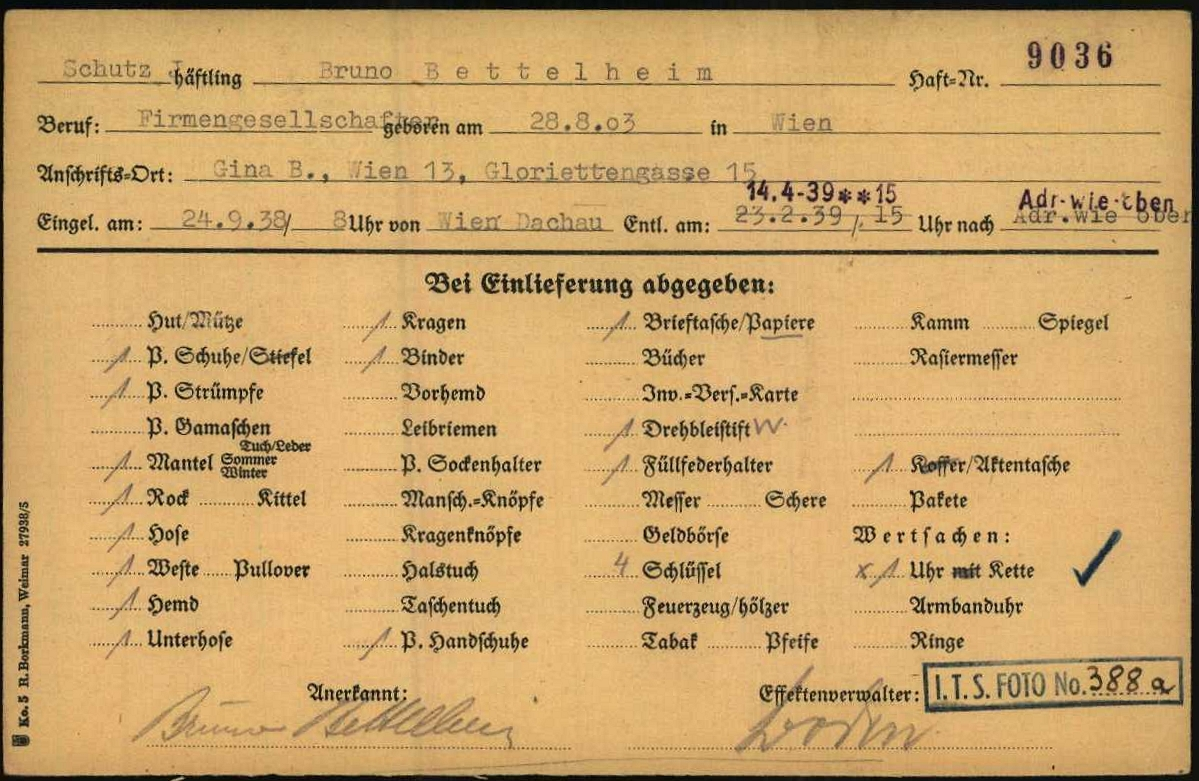
List of personal effects of Bruno Bettelheim as a prisoner at Buchenwald concentration camp

Jewish by birth, Bettelheim grew up in a secular family. After the Anschluss (political annexation) of Austria on March 13, 1938, the National Socialist (Nazi) authorities sent Austrian Jews and political opponents to the Dachau and Buchenwald concentration camps where many were brutally treated, and tortured or killed. Bettelheim was arrested some two months later on May 28, 1938, and was imprisoned in both these camps for a combined total of ten and a half months before being released on April 14, 1939. While at the Buchenwald camp, he met and befriended the social psychologist Ernst Federn. Bettelheim's release from the camp and emigration to the United States in 1939 was due to an intervention by Eleanor Roosevelt and others. He drew on the experience of the concentration camps for some of his later work.

== Life and career in the United States ==
Bettelheim arrived by ship as a refugee in New York City in late 1939 to join his wife Gina, who had already emigrated. They divorced because she had become involved with someone else during their separation. He soon moved to Chicago, became a naturalized U.S. citizen in 1944, and married an Austrian woman, Gertrude ('Trudi') Weinfeld, also an emigrant from Vienna.

=== Psychology ===
The Rockefeller Foundation sponsored a wartime project to help resettle European scholars by circulating their resumes to American universities. Through this process, Ralph Tyler hired Bettelheim to be his research assistant at the University of Chicago from 1939 to 1941 with funding from the Progressive Education Association to evaluate how high schools taught art. Once this funding ran out, Bettelheim found a job at Rockford College, Illinois, where he taught from 1942 to 1944.

In 1943, he published the paper "Individual and Mass Behavior in Extreme Situations" about his experiences in the Nazi concentration camps, a paper which was highly regarded by General Dwight Eisenhower among others. Bettelheim claimed he had interviewed 1,500 fellow prisoners, although this was unlikely. He stated that the Viennese psychoanalyst Richard Sterba had analyzed him, as well as implying in several of his writings that he had written a PhD dissertation in the philosophy of education. Bettelheim actually wrote his dissertation in the branch of aesthetics and he had only taken three introductory courses in psychology.

Through Ralph Tyler's recommendation, the University of Chicago appointed Bettelheim as a professor of psychology, as well as director of the Sonia Shankman Orthogenic School for emotionally disturbed children. He held both positions from 1944 until his retirement in 1973. He wrote a number of books on psychology and, for a time, had an international reputation for his work on Sigmund Freud, psychoanalysis, and emotionally disturbed children.

At the Orthogenic School, Bettelheim made changes and set up an environment for milieu therapy, in which children could form strong attachments with adults within a structured but caring environment. He claimed considerable success in treating some of the emotionally disturbed children. He wrote books on both normal and abnormal child psychology, and became a major influence in the field, widely respected during his lifetime. He was noted for his study of feral children, who revert to the animal stage without experiencing the benefits of belonging to a community. He discussed this phenomenon in the book The Informed Heart. Even critics agree that, in his practice, Bettelheim was dedicated to helping these children, using methods and practices that would enable them to lead happy lives. It is based on his position that psychotherapy could change humans and that they can adapt to their environment provided they are given proper care and attention.

Bettelheim was elected a Fellow of the American Academy of Arts and Sciences in 1971. After retiring in 1973, he and his wife moved to Portola Valley, California, where he continued to write and taught at Stanford University. His wife died in 1984.

=== The Uses of Enchantment ===
Bettelheim analyzed fairy tales in terms of Freudian psychology in The Uses of Enchantment (1976). He discussed the emotional and symbolic importance of fairy tales for children, including traditional tales once considered too dark, such as those collected and published by the Brothers Grimm. Bettelheim suggested that traditional fairy tales, with the darkness of abandonment, death, witches, and injuries, allowed children to grapple with their fears in remote, symbolic terms. If they could read and interpret these fairy tales in their own way, he believed, they would get a greater sense of meaning and purpose. Bettelheim thought that by engaging with these socially evolved stories, children would go through emotional growth that would better prepare them for their own futures. In the United States, Bettelheim won two major awards for The Uses of Enchantment: the National Book Critics Circle Award for Criticism and the National Book Award in the category of Contemporary Thought.

However, in 1991, well-supported charges of plagiarism were brought against Bettelheim's The Uses of Enchantment, primarily that he had copied from Julius Heuscher's A Psychiatric Study of Myths and Fairy Tales: Their Origin, Meaning, and Usefulness (1963, revised ed. 1974).

=== Death ===
At the end of his life, Bettelheim had depression. He appeared to have had difficulties with depression for much of his life. In 1990, widowed, in failing physical health, and experiencing the effects of a stroke which impaired his mental abilities and paralyzed part of his body, he took his own life. He died on March 13, 1990, in Maryland.

== In popular culture ==
Bettelheim was a public intellectual, whose writing and many public appearances in popular media paralleled a growing post WWII interest in psychoanalysis. For instance, he appeared multiple times on The Dick Cavett Show in the 70s to discuss theories of autism and psychoanalysis. Richard Pollak's biography of Bettelheim argues that such popular appearances shielded his unethical behavior from scrutiny.

Bettelheim appeared as himself in the 1983 Woody Allen mockumentary Zelig.

A BBC Horizon documentary about Bettelheim was televised in 1987.

== Controversies and scientific fraud accusations ==
Bettelheim's life and work have been called into question since his death, specifically in a critical biography by Richard Pollak (1997).

=== Misrepresented credentials ===
Though he spent most of his life working in psychology and psychiatry, Bettelheim's educational background in those fields is murky at best. When he was hired at the University of Chicago, Ralph W. Tyler assumed that he had two PhDs, one in art history and the other in psychology. He also believed, falsely, that Bettelheim was certified to conduct psychoanalysis though Bettelheim never received such certification. A posthumous review of his transcript showed that Bettelheim had only taken three introductory classes in psychology. Bertram Cohler and Jacquelyn Sanders at the Orthogenic School believed Bettelheim had a PhD in art history. In some of his own writings, Bettelheim implied that he had written a dissertation on the philosophy of education.

Determining Bettelheim's education is complicated by the fact that he routinely embellished or inflated aspects of his own biography. As an example, Bettelheim's first wife, Gina, took care of a troubled American child, Patsy, who lived in their home in Vienna for seven years. Although Bettelheim later claimed he himself had taken care of the child, there is general agreement that his wife actually provided most of the child care. However sources disagree on whether Patsy was autistic. Bettelheim later claimed that it was Patsy who inspired him to study autism and embellished her into two or even several autistic children in his home.

Additionally, when he applied for a position at Rockford College in Illinois, he claimed in a résumé that he had earned summa cum laude doctorates in philosophy, art history, and psychology, and he made claims that he had run the art department at Lower Austria's library, that he had published two books on art, that he had excavated Roman antiquities, and that he had engaged in music studies with Arnold Schoenberg. When he applied at the University of Chicago for a professorship and as director of the Orthogenic School, he further claimed that he had training in psychology, experience raising autistic children, and personal encouragement from Sigmund Freud. The University of Chicago biographical sketch of Bettelheim listed a single PhD but no subject area. Posthumous biographies of Bettelheim have investigated these claims and have come to no clear conclusions about his credentials. A review in The Independent (UK) of Sutton's book stated that Bettelheim "despite claims to the contrary, possessed no psychology qualifications of any sort". Another review in The New York Times by a different reviewer stated that Bettelheim "began inventing degrees he never earned". A review in the Chicago Tribune stated "as Pollak demonstrates, Bettelheim was a snake-oil salesman of the first magnitude."

In a 1997 Weekly Standard article Peter Kramer, clinical professor of psychiatry at Brown University, summarized: "There were snatches of truth in the tall tale, but not many. Bettelheim had earned a non-honors degree in philosophy, he had made acquaintances in the psychoanalytic community, and his first wife had helped raise a troubled child. But, from 1926 to 1938, —the bulk of the '14 years' at university—Bettelheim had worked as a lumber dealer in the family business."

In his 1997 review of Pollak's book in the Baltimore Sun, Paul R. McHugh, then director of Psychiatry and Behavioral Sciences at Johns Hopkins, stated "Bettelheim—with boldness, energy and luck—exploited American deference to Freudo-Nietzschean mind-sets and interpretation, especially when intoned in accents Viennese."

==== Richard Pollak's 1997 biography of Bettelheim ====
In the New York Review of Books, Robert Gottlieb describes Richard Pollak as a "relentlessly negative biographer", but Gottlieb still writes: "The accusations against Bettelheim fall into several categories. First, he lied; that is, he both exaggerated his successes at the school and falsified aspects of his background, claiming a more elaborate academic and psychoanalytic history in Vienna than he had actually had. There is conclusive evidence to support both charges." Gottlieb goes on to say that Bettelheim arrived in the United States as a Holocaust survivor and refugee without a job nor even a profession, and writes: "I suspect he said what he thought it was necessary to say, and was then stuck with these claims later on, when he could neither confirm them (since they were false) nor, given his pride, acknowledge that he had lied."

Richard Pollak's biography begins with a personal account, for his brother died in an accident while home from Bettelheim's school on holiday. While playing hide-and-go-seek in a hay loft, the brother fell through a chute covered with hay and hit the concrete floor on the level below. Years later, Pollak hoped to get some information about his brother's life and sought out Bettelheim. As Pollak recounts, "Bettelheim immediately launched into an attack. The boys' father, he said, was a simple-minded 'schlemiel.' Their mother, he insisted, had rejected Stephen at birth forcing him to develop 'pseudo-feeble-mindedness' to cope." He went on to angrily ask: "What is it about these Jewish mothers, Mr. Pollak?" Bettelheim furthermore insisted the brother had committed suicide and made it look like an accident. Pollak did not believe this.

As a review in the Baltimore Sun states, "The stance of infallibility over matters Pollak knew to be untrue prompted him to wonder about the foundation of Bettelheim's commanding reputation."

In a 1997 book review in the New York Times, Sarah Boxer wrote (regarding the plagiarism allegations): "Mr. Pollak gives a damning passage-for-passage comparison of the two [Bettelheim's book and Heuscher's earlier book]."

Richard Pollak's biography, The Creation of Dr. B, portrays Bettelheim as an anti-Semite even though he was raised in a secular Jewish household, and asserts that Bettelheim criticized in others the same cowardice he himself had displayed in the concentration camps.

Pollak's biography also states that two women reported that Bettelheim had fondled their breasts and those of other female students at the school while he was ostensibly apologizing to each for beating them.

A number of reviewers criticized Pollak's writing style, commenting that his book was motivated by "Vengeance, not malice" or that his book was "curiously unnuanced", but they still largely agreed with his conclusions.

=== Plagiarism in Bettelheim's Uses of Enchantment ===
In 1991, Alan Dundes published an article in the Journal of American Folklore in which he claimed Bettelheim had engaged in plagiarism in his 1976 The Uses of Enchantment. He argued that Bettelheim had copied from a variety of sources, including Dundes' own 1967 paper on Cinderella, but most of all from Julius E. Heuscher's 1963 book A Psychiatric Study of Fairy Tales (revised edition 1974).

On the other hand, Jacquelyn Sanders, who worked with Bettelheim and later became director of the Orthogenic School, stated that she had read Dundes' article but disagreed with its conclusions: "I would not call that plagiarism. I think the article is a reasonable scholarly endeavor, and calling it scholarly etiquette is appropriate. It is appropriate that this man deserved to be acknowledged and Bettelheim didn't… But I would not fail a student for doing that, and I don't know anybody who would".

=== Abusive treatment of students ===
Many students and staff at the school have argued that Bettelheim was abusive, violent, and cruel to them and to others. There are multiple newspaper accounts of abuse, in letters, editorials, articles, and memoirs. A November 1990 Chicago Tribune article states: "Of the 19 alumni of the Orthogenic School interviewed for this story, some are still bitterly angry at Bettelheim, 20 or 30 years after leaving the institution due to the trauma they had suffered under him. Others say their stays did them good, and they express gratitude for having had the opportunity to be at the school. All agree that Bettelheim frequently struck his young and vulnerable patients."

A particularly evocative example came from Alida Jatich, who lived at the school from 1966 to 1972 from ages twelve to eighteen. She wrote an initially anonymous April 1990 letter to the Chicago Reader in which she stated that she "lived in fear of Bettelheim's unpredictable temper tantrums, public beatings, hair pulling, wild accusations and threats and abuse in front of classmates and staff. One minute he could be smiling and joking, the next minute he could be exploding." She added, "In person, he was an evil man who set up his school as a private empire and himself as a demi-god or cultleader." Jatich said Bettelheim had "bullied, awed, and terrorized" the children at his school, their parents, school staff members, his graduate students, and anyone else who came into contact with him.

Jacquelyn Sanders, who later became director of the Orthogenic School, said she thought it was a case of Bettelheim getting too much success too quickly. "Dr. B got worse once he started getting acclaim", she said. "He was less able to have any insight into his effect on these kids."

Conversely, some staff who worked at the Orthogenic School have stated that they saw Bettelheim's behavior as being corporal punishment, in line with the standards of the time, and not abuse. As an example, David Zwerdling, who was a counselor at the school for one year in 1969–70, wrote a September 1990 response to The Washington Post in which he stated, "I witnessed one occasion when an adolescent boy cursed at a female counselor. Incensed upon learning of this, Dr. Bettelheim proceeded to slap the boy two or three times across the face, while telling him sternly never to speak that way to a woman again. This was the only such incident I observed or heard of during my year at the school… until fairly recently, the near-consensus against corporal punishment in schools did not obtain." However, Zwerdling also noted, "He also was a man who, for whatever reasons, was capable of intense anger on occasion."

Published books, memoirs, and biographies of Bettelheim have also taken up the question of his treatment of students.

==== Institutional and professional non-responses ====
Perhaps in part because of Bettelheim's professional and public stature, there was little effort during his lifetime to curtail his behavior or intervene on behalf of his victims. His work at the University of Chicago seems to have been given less formal oversight by the university than other research entities under their purview.

A Newsweek article reported that Chicago-area psychiatrists had privately given him the nickname "Brutalheim", but did nothing to intervene effectively on behalf of students at the school.

Professionals in the psychiatric and psychological communities likely knew there were allegations of abuse and maltreatment at the Orthogenic School. Howard Gardner, a professor at the Harvard Graduate School of Education, wrote that many professionals knew of Bettelheim's behavior but did not confront him for various reasons ranging from "fear about Bettelheim's legendary capacity for retribution to the solidarity needed among the guild of healers to a feeling that, on balance, Bettelheim's positive attributes predominated and an unmasking would fuel more malevolent forces."

=== Autism controversy ===
Autism spectrum conditions are currently regarded as perhaps having multiple forms with a variety of genetic, epigenetic, and brain development causes influenced by such environmental factors as complications during pregnancy, viral infections, and perhaps even air pollution.

Bettelheim was a prominent proponent of a psychogenic account of autism, which held that autism had origins in early childhood events or trauma acting on the child from the outside. For Bettelheim, the idea that outside forces cause individual behavior issues can be traced back to his earliest prominent article on the psychology of imprisoned persons. Bettelheim believed that autism resulted when mothers withheld appropriate affection from their children and failed to make a good connection with them. Bettelheim popularized the Leo Kanner's term "refrigerator mother" to describe such allegedly distant mothers. Bettelheim also blamed absent or weak fathers.

Jordynn Jack writes that Bettelheim's ideas gained currency and became popular in large part because society already tended to blame a mother first and foremost for her child's difficulties. As Lisa D. Benaron describes in her book Autism, "Although it now seems beyond comprehension that anyone would believe that autism is caused by deep-seated issues arising in early childhood relationships, virtually every psychiatric condition was attributed to parent-child relationships in the 1940s and 1950s, when Freudian psychoanalytic theory was in its heyday."

Bettelheim adapted and transformed the Orthogenic School at the University of Chicago as a residential treatment milieu for such children, who he felt would benefit from a "parentectomy". This marked the apex of autism viewed as a disorder of parenting.

One of his most famous books, The Empty Fortress (1967), contains a complex and detailed explanation of this dynamic in psychoanalytical and psychological terms. These views were disputed at the time by mothers of autistic children and by researchers. He derived his thinking from the qualitative investigation of clinical cases. He also related the world of autistic children to conditions in concentration camps.

Beginning in the 1960s and into the 1970s, "biogenesis", the idea that such conditions had an inner-organic or biological basis overtook psychogenesis, and currently, Bettelheim's theories in which he attributes autism spectrum conditions to parenting style have been largely discredited, and his reporting rates of cure have been questioned, with critics stating that his patients were not actually autistic.

By his 1987 book, A Good Enough Parent, he had embraced Winnicott's concept of the good enough parent and still described children "without being truly autistic" presenting "symptoms of autism" as the result of childhood deprivation.

The two biographies by Sutton (1995) and Pollak (1997) awakened interest and focus on Bettelheim's actual methods as distinct from his public persona. In a favorable review of Pollak's biography, Christopher Lehmann-Haupt of The New York Times wrote, "What scanty evidence remains suggests that his patients were not even autistic in the first place."

In a 1997 review of two books on Bettelheim, Molly Finn wrote "I am the mother of an autistic daughter, and have considered Bettelheim a charlatan since The Empty Fortress, his celebrated study of autism, came out in 1967. I have nothing personal against Bettelheim, if it is not personal to resent being compared to a devouring witch, an infanticidal king, and an SS guard in a concentration camp, or to wonder what could be the basis of Bettelheim's statement that 'the precipitating factor in infantile autism is the parent's wish that his child should not exist.'"

In 1997 the psychiatrist Peter Kramer wrote, "The Ford Foundation was willing to underwrite innovative treatments for autistic children, so Bettelheim labeled his children autistic. Few actually met the definition of the newly minted syndrome."

A 2002 book on autism spectrum stated, "At the time, few people knew that Bettelheim had faked his credentials and was using fictional data to support his research." Michael Rutter has observed, "Many people made a mistake in going from a statement which is undoubtedly true—that there is no evidence that autism has been caused by poor parenting—to the statement that it has been disproven. It has not actually been disproven. It has faded away simply because, on the one hand, of a lack of convincing evidence and on the other hand, an awareness that autism was a neurodevelopmental disorder of some kind."

Although Bettelheim foreshadowed the modern interest in the causal influence of genetics in the section Parental Background, he consistently emphasised nurture over nature. For example: "When at last the once totally frozen affects begin to emerge, and a much richer human personality to evolve, then convictions about the psychogenic nature of the disturbance become stronger still."; On Treatability, p. 412. The rates of recovery claimed for the Orthogenic School are set out in Follow-up Data, with a recovery good enough to be considered a 'cure' of 43%, pp. 414–15.

Subsequently, medical research has provided greater understanding of the biological basis of autism and other illnesses. Scientists such as Bernard Rimland challenged Bettelheim's view of autism by arguing that autism is a neurodevelopmental issue. As late as 2009, the "refrigerator mother" theory retained some prominent supporters, including the prominent Irish psychologist Tony Humphreys. His theory still enjoys widespread support in France.

In his book Unstrange Minds (2007), Roy Richard Grinker wrote:

Two other books on autism, published at about the same time [as Bettelheim's Empty Fortress (1967)], got little mention in the press: Bernard Rimland's Autism: The Syndrome and Its Implications for a Neural Theory of Behavior (1964), which outlined the biological and neurological aspects of autism, and Clara Clairborne Park's The Siege (1967), a beautifully written memoir of raising an autistic child. Though they were more accurate depictions of autism, they couldn't compete with Bettelheim. He was simply too good a writer, and with his Viennese accent—the sign of an authentic expert in psychology—too good a self promoter.

Robert Sapolsky comments:

Bruno Bettelheim was a fraud and a monster. He faked his data, he faked his European academic credentials when he came to the US as a refugee. He was a sadistic bastard to autistic children who wound up in his program, to people under his mentorship who he was sort of leading along in their careers. And he persisted with this long after there was definitive proof that there was no such thing as a refrigerator mothering cause of autism and he went to his grave refusing to apologize. A vile monstrous person, and a really interesting study in that he was not deceiving himself--he damn well knew what a fraud he was.

=== Remarks about Jews and the Holocaust ===
Bettelheim's experiences during the Holocaust shaped his personal and professional life for years after. His first publication was "Individual and Mass Behavior in Extreme Situations" derived from his experiences at Dachau and Buchenwald. His later work frequently compared emotionally disturbed childhood to prison or confinement, and according to Sutton, his professional work attempted to operationalize the lessons about human nature he learned during his confinement.

Bettelheim became one of the most prominent defenders of Hannah Arendt's book Eichmann in Jerusalem. He wrote a positive review for The New Republic. This review prompted a letter from a writer, Harry Golden, who alleged that both Bettelheim and Arendt suffered from "an essentially Jewish phenomenon… self-hatred".

Bettelheim would later speak critically of Jewish people who were killed during the Holocaust. He has been criticized for promoting the myth that Jews went "like sheep to the slaughter" and for blaming Anne Frank and her family for their own deaths due to not owning firearms, fleeing, or hiding more effectively. In an introduction he wrote to an account by Miklos Nyiszli, Bettelheim stated, discussing Frank, that "Everybody who recognized the obvious knew that the hardest way to go underground was to do it as a family; that to hide as a family made detection by the SS most likely. The Franks, with their excellent connections among gentile Dutch families should have had an easy time hiding out singly, each with a different family. But instead of planning for this, the main principle of their planning was to continue as much as possible with the kind of family life they were accustomed to."

== Bibliography ==
=== Major works by Bettelheim ===
- 1943 "Individual and Mass Behavior in Extreme Situations", Journal of Abnormal and Social Psychology, 38: 417–452.
- 1950 Bettleheim, Bruno and Janowitz, Morris, Dynamics of Prejudice: A Psychological & Sociological Study of Veterans, Harper & Bros.
- 1950 Love Is Not Enough: The Treatment of Emotionally Disturbed Children, Free Press, Glencoe, Ill.
- 1954 Symbolic Wounds: Puberty Rites and the Envious Male, Free Press, Glencoe, Ill.
- 1955 Truants From Life: The Rehabilitation of Emotionally Disturbed Children, Free Press, Glencoe, Ill.
- 1959 "Joey: A 'Mechanical Boy'", Scientific American, 200, March 1959: 117–126. (About a boy who believes himself to be a robot.)
- 1960 The Informed Heart: Autonomy in a Mass Age, The Free Press, Glencoe, Ill.
- 1962 Dialogues with Mothers, The Free Press, Glencoe, Ill.
- 1967 The Empty Fortress: Infantile Autism and the Birth of the Self, The Free Press, New York
- 1969 The Children of the Dream, Macmillan, London & New York (About the raising of children in a kibbutz environment.)
- 1974 A Home for the Heart, Knopf, New York. (About Bettelheim's Orthogenic School at the University of Chicago for schizophrenic and autistic children.)
- 1976 The Uses of Enchantment: The Meaning and Importance of Fairy Tales, Knopf, New York. ISBN 0-394-49771-6
- 1979 Surviving and Other Essays, Knopf, New York (Includes the essay "The Ignored Lesson of Anne Frank".)
- 1982 On Learning to Read: The Child's Fascination with Meaning (with Karen Zelan), Knopf, New York
- 1982 Freud and Man's Soul, Knopf, 1983, ISBN 0-394-52481-0
- 1987 A Good Enough Parent: A Book on Child-Rearing, Knopf, New York
- 1990 Freud's Vienna and Other Essays, Knopf, New York
- 1993, Bettelheim, Bruno and Rosenfeld, Alvin A, "The Art of the Obvious" Knopf.
- 1994 Bettelheim, Bruno & Ekstein, Rudolf: "Grenzgänge zwischen den Kulturen. Das letzte Gespräch zwischen Bruno Bettelheim und Rudolf Ekstein". In: Kaufhold, Roland (ed.) (1994): Annäherung an Bruno Bettelheim. Mainz (Grünewald): 49–60.

=== Critical reviews of Bettelheim (works and person) ===
- Angres, Ronald: "Who, Really, Was Bruno Bettelheim?", personal essay, Commentary, 90, (4), October 1990: 26–30.
- Bernstein, Richard: "Accusations of Abuse Haunt the Legacy of Dr. Bruno Bettelheim", The New York Times, November 4, 1990: "The Week in Review" section.
- Bersihand, Geneviève (1977). Bettelheim [Bettelheim]. Champigny-sur-Marne: R. Jauze. p. 199. ISBN 2-86214-001-5.
- Dundes, Alan: "Bruno Bettelheim's Uses of Enchantment and Abuses of Scholarship". The Journal of American Folklore, Vol. 104, N0. 411. (Winter, 1991): 74–83.
- Ekstein, Rudolf (1994): "Mein Freund Bruno (1903–1990). Wie ich mich an ihn erinnere". In: Kaufhold, Roland (ed.) (1994): Annäherung an Bruno Bettelheim. Mainz (Grünewald), S. 87–94.
- Eliot, Stephen: Not the Thing I Was: Thirteen Years at Bruno Bettelheim's Orthogenic School, St. Martin's Press, 2003.
- Federn, Ernst (1994): "Bruno Bettelheim und das Überleben im Konzentrationslager". In: Kaufhold, Roland (ed.) (1999): Ernst Federn: Versuche zur Psychologie des Terrors. Gießen (Psychosozial-Verlag): 105–108.
- Finn M (1997). "In the case of Bruno Bettelheim". First Things (74): 44–8.
- Fisher, David James: Psychoanalytische Kulturkritik und die Seele des Menschen. Essays über Bruno Bettelheim (co-editor: Roland Kaufhold), Gießen (Psychosozial-Verlag)
- Fisher, David James: Bettelheim: Living and Dying, Contemporary Psychoanalytic Studies, Amsterdam, New York: Brill/Rodopi, 2008.
- Frattaroli, Elio: "Bruno Bettelheim's Unrecognized Contribution to Psychoanalytic Thought", Psychoanalytic Review, 81:379–409, 1994.
- Heisig, James W.: "Bruno Bettelheim and the Fairy Tales", Children's Literature, 6, 1977: 93–115.
- Kaufhold, Roland (ed.): Pioniere der psychoanalytischen Pädagogik: Bruno Bettelheim, Rudolf Ekstein, Ernst Federn und Siegfried Bernfeld, psychosozial Nr. 53 (1/1993)
- Kaufhold, Roland (Ed.): Annäherung an Bruno Bettelheim. Mainz, 1994 (Grünewald)
- Kaufhold, Roland (1999): "Falsche Fabeln vom Guru?" Der "Spiegel" und sein Märchen vom bösen Juden Bruno Bettelheim", Behindertenpädagogik, 38. Jhg., Heft 2/1999, S. 160–187.
- Kaufhold, Roland: Bettelheim, Ekstein, Federn: Impulse für die psychoanalytisch-pädagogische Bewegung. Gießen, 2001 (Psychosozial-Verlag).
- Kaufhold, Roland/Löffelholz, Michael (Ed.) (2003): "'So können sie nicht leben' – Bruno Bettelheim (1903–1990)". Zeitschrift für Politische Psychologie 1-3/2003.
- Lyons, Tom W. (1983), The Pelican and After: A Novel about Emotional Disturbance, Richmond, Virginia: Prescott, Durrell, and Company. This is a roman à clef novel in which the author lived at the Orthogenic School for almost twelve years. The novel's head of the institution is a "Dr. V."
- Marcus, Paul: Autonomy in the Extreme Situation. Bruno Bettelheim, the Nazi Concentration Camps and the Mass Society, Praeger, Westport, Conn., 1999.
- Pollak, Richard: The Creation of Dr. B: A Biography of Bruno Bettelheim, Simon & Schuster, New York, 1997.
- Raines, Theron (2002). Rising to the light : a portrait of Bruno Bettelheim (1 ed.). New York: Alfred A. Knopf. ISBN 0-679-40196-2.
- Redford, Roberta Carly (2010) Crazy: My Seven Years At Bruno Bettelheim's Orthogenic School, Trafford Publishing, 364 pages.
- Sutton, Nina: Bruno Bettelheim: The Other Side of Madness, Duckworth Press, London, 1995. (Translated from the French by David Sharp in collaboration with the author. Subsequently, published with the title Bruno Bettelheim, a Life and a Legacy.)
- Zipes, Jack: "On the Use and Abuse of Folk and Fairy Tales with Children: Bruno Bettelheim's Moralistic Magic Wand", in Zipes, Jack: Breaking the Magic Spell: Radical Theories of Folk and Fairy Tales, University of Texas Press, Austin, 1979.
