= Daniel Karlin =

British literary scholar

Daniel Karlin (born 4 December 1953) is a British literary scholar. He was educated at St Paul's School, London (1967-1970) and Queens' College, Cambridge, where he studied for his BA (1971-1974) and PhD (1975-1978). He was a Junior Research Fellow at Merton College, Oxford (1978-1980), and held appointments at University College London (1980-2004), Boston University (2005-2006), University of Sheffield (2006-2010), and University of Bristol (2010-2020), where he was Winterstoke Professor of English Literature. He retired in 2020 and was appointed Emeritus Professor of English at the University of Bristol. In the same year he was elected to a Fellowship of the British Academy. His research interests include Romantic and Victorian poetry; Robert Browning; Elizabeth Barrett Browning; Henry James; Rudyard Kipling; Marcel Proust; and Bob Dylan.

== Books ==
The Courtship of Robert Browning and Elizabeth Barrett (Oxford University Press, 1985)

(ed.) Rudyard Kipling, The Jungle Books (Penguin, 1986)

(ed.) Robert Browning and Elizabeth Barrett: The Courtship Correspondence 1845-1846 (Oxford University Press, 1989)

(ed.) Robert Browning: Selected Poems (Penguin, 1989)

(ed., with John Woolford), The Poems of Browning, vol. 1: 1826-1840 (Longman, 1991) [Longman Annotated English Poets]

(ed., with John Woolford), The Poems of Browning, vol. 2: 1841-1846 (Longman, 1991) [Longman Annotated English Poets]

(ed.) Rider Haggard, She (Oxford University Press, 1991) [Oxford World's Classics]

Browning’s Hatreds (Oxford University Press, 1993)

(ed.) Penguin Book of Victorian Verse (Penguin, 1997)

(ed.) Rudyard Kipling: Selected Poetry and Prose (Oxford University Press, 1999) [Oxford Authors; re-issued in Oxford World's Classics as Rudyard Kipling: Stories and Poems, 2015]

Proust’s English (Oxford University Press, 2005)

(ed., with John Woolford and Joseph Phelan), The Poems of Browning, vol. 3: 1847-1861 (Pearson, 2007) [Longman Annotated English Poets]

(ed.) Edward FitzGerald, Rubáiyát of Omar Khayyám (Oxford University Press, 2009)

(ed., with John Woolford and Joseph Phelan), The Poems of Browning, vol. 4: 1862-1871, (Pearson, 2012) [Longman Annotated English Poets]

The Figure of the Singer (Oxford University Press, 2013)

Street Songs: Writers and Urban Songs and Cries, 1800-1925 (Oxford University Press, 2018) [Based on the Clarendon Lectures at the University of Oxford, 2016]

(ed.) Henry James, The Bostonians (Cambridge University Press, 2019) [The Cambridge Edition of the Complete Fiction of Henry James, vol. 8]

(ed., with John Woolford and Joseph Phelan), The Poems of Browning, vols. 5 and 6: The Ring and the Book, (Routledge, 2022) [Longman Annotated English Poets]

== Selected journal articles, essays and chapters in books ==
'Whitman: The Civil War Poems'. Proceedings of the British Academy 73 (1987), pp. 259–284 [The Chatterton Lecture on Poetry, 1987]

'Plain Tales?' Kipling Considered, ed. P. Mallett (Macmillan, 1989), pp. 1–18.

'"Beatrice Signorini": Browning's Last Portrait'. Browning e Venezia, ed. S. Perosa (Firenze, 1991), pp. 325–337.

'Did He Eat Ortolans? Browning, Food, and Italy'. Robert Browning in Contexts, ed. J. Woolford (Wedgestone Press, 1998), pp. 148 – 160.

'Having the Whip-Hand in Middlemarch'. Rereading Victorian Fiction, ed. A. Jenkins and J. John (Macmillan, 2000).

'Bob Dylan's Names'. Do You Mr Jones? Bob Dylan among the Poets and Professors, ed. N. Corcoran (Chatto & Windus, 2002), pp. 27–49.

'"The Names": Robert Browning's "Shaksperean Show"'. Victorian Shakespeare [vol. 2: Literature and Culture], ed. A. Poole and G. Marshall (Palgrave Macmillan, 2003), pp. 150–169.

'The Case of the Capable Fingers: a Della Street Mystery'. Literary Secretaries and Secretarial Culture, ed. P. Thurschwell and L. Price (Ashgate, 2005), pp. 111–128.

'From Dark Defile to Gethsemane: Rudyard Kipling's War Poetry'. Oxford Handbook of Twentieth-Century British and Irish War Poetry, ed. T. Kendall (Oxford University Press, 2007), pp. 51–72.

'"I have strange power of speech": Narrative Compulsion after Coleridge'. Coleridge’s Afterlives, ed. J. Vigus and J. Wright (Palgrave Macmillan, 2008), pp. 128–148.

'Tennyson, Browning, Virgil'. Tennyson Among the Poets, ed. R. Douglas-Fairhurst, and S. Perry (Oxford University Press, 2009), pp. 95–114.

'"The song-bird whose name is Legion": Bad Verse and its Critics'. Oxford Handbook of Victorian Poetry, ed. M. Bevis (Oxford University Press, 2013), pp. 834–852.

'"Our precious quand même": le français dans les lettres de Henry James. Cahiers victoriens et édouardiens 78 (automne 2013) [Article in English; online publ.]

'Actions and Reactions: Kipling's Edwardian Summer'. In Time's Eye: Essays on Rudyard Kipling, ed. J. Montefiore (Manchester University Press, 2013), pp. 111–128.

'Bob Dylan and Allen Ginsberg: at Kerouac's grave, and beyond'. Popular Music History 8.2 (2014), pp. 155–68.

'Editing Poems in Letters'. Letter Writing Among Poets: From William Wordsworth to Elizabeth Bishop, ed. J. Ellis (Edinburgh University Press, 2015), pp. 31–46.

'"The Owl and the Pussy-cat" and other poems of love and marriage'. Edward Lear and the Play of Poetry, ed. M. Bevis and J. Williams (Oxford University Press, 2016), pp. 202–222.

'"In Vishnu-land what avatar?" Robert Browning and the Empire of Song'. Literary Location and Dislocation of Myth in the Post/Colonial Anglophone World, ed. A. Dodeman and É. Raimbault (Rodopi, 2017), pp. 179–194.

'Traduire les cris de Paris dans La Prisonnière'. Son et traduction dans l'oeuvre de Proust, ed. E. Eells and N. Toth (Honoré Champion, 2018) pp. 105–121. [Recherches proustiennes no. 41].

'Language and understanding in Rudyard Kipling's Thy Servant a Dog'. Kipling Journal 92.374 (2018), pp. 8–19.
