= Sonia Shankman Orthogenic School =

The Sonia Shankman Orthogenic School

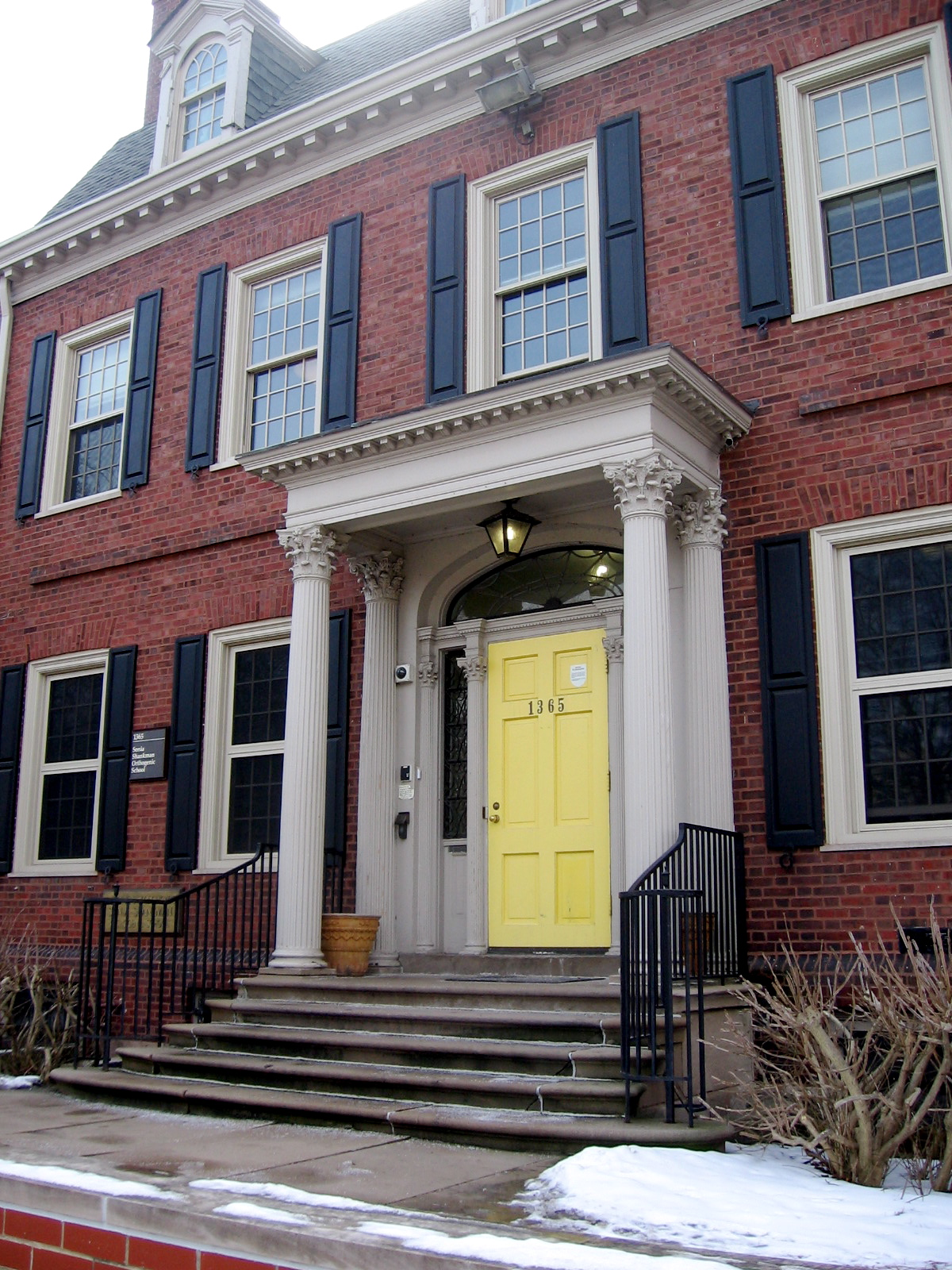
- The front door of the Orthogenic School's former building, with the iconic "yellow door" that has become a trademark of the school.

Location
- 6245 S. Ingleside Avenue; Chicago, Illinois 60637; United States; 41.780722°N 87.602662°W

Information
- Type: Therapeutic Day School
- Motto: Providing a safe haven and a path to hope
- Founded: 1915
- Grades: 4-12
- Age: 8 to 18
- Enrollment: 110-150
- Average class size: 8-10
- Student to teacher ratio: 4:1
- Hours in school day: 6
- Newspaper: The Yellow Door Chronicles
- Information: 773-702-1203 ext. 100
- Website: website

The Sonia Shankman Orthogenic School, also known simply as the Orthogenic School or informally as the O-School, is a therapeutic day school for children and adolescents typically classified as emotionally challenged in the age range of elementary to high school. The O-School specializes in the treatment of youth and help them with their behavioral and emotional problems. The school is located adjacent to the campus of the University of Chicago (UC). The school works with many schools and universities, and has affiliation with several Chicago area schools including the Family Institute at Northwestern University, the School of Social Service Administration of the UC, and the Jane Addams School of Social Work of the University of Illinois at Chicago.

== Highlights ==
The school is able to adequately educate students of above-average intelligence and assist students in pursuing advanced courses on an individual or group basis. Students may also attend local universities or private and public schools on a part-time basis. Currently, the school is able to treat students in an unlocked setting without utilizing seclusion or medical restraint. Dorm counselors, teachers, and teaching assistants typically have a bachelor's degree and experience in working with young people. Typically the staff to student ratio is very high, with an average of two staff members supervising five to eight students at a time, with support of masters-level staff, educational staff, and crisis intervention staff.

While at school the students have contact with a staff of therapists, program managers, special education teachers, art teachers, teaching assistants, and other professionals. Students with appropriate privileges have the opportunity of going out into the community several days a week, with some students able to leave the school on independent outings into the community.

The school has developed a comprehensive transition program for adolescent students leaving for home, college, or independent living. Students in the Transitional Living Center have the support of the school staff, their old dorm staff, and the transitional living staff. They are typically able to go into the community and pursue employment, educational options, and other community activities. Students stay in the transitional program for periods ranging from several months to two years.

The school is located on the campus of the University of Chicago. Because of this, students are able to utilize many campus facilities during the day.

The school also has several extracurricular programs, including a student work program, student government, a local Junior Achievement charter, a literary magazine and a student newspaper. Students can participate in as many extracurricular activities as they like, so long as their behavior and academic performance are within acceptable boundaries.

=== Parental contact ===
Students attend periodic family sessions with their program manager or individual therapist. When there was a residential program, the dorm counselors regularly contacted parents and updated them on their child's progress, and students were able to call home at least once a week and can write as often as they wish. When students gained the appropriate privileges and have demonstrated safe behaviors they could have home visits, typically starting every other weekend and progressing to every weekend during transition phases.

Students who were not able to go home due to distance or behavior were allowed to visit their parents at the school or in the local community. Contact with friends may have been restricted, although appropriate letter writing was usually encouraged.

=== Student life ===
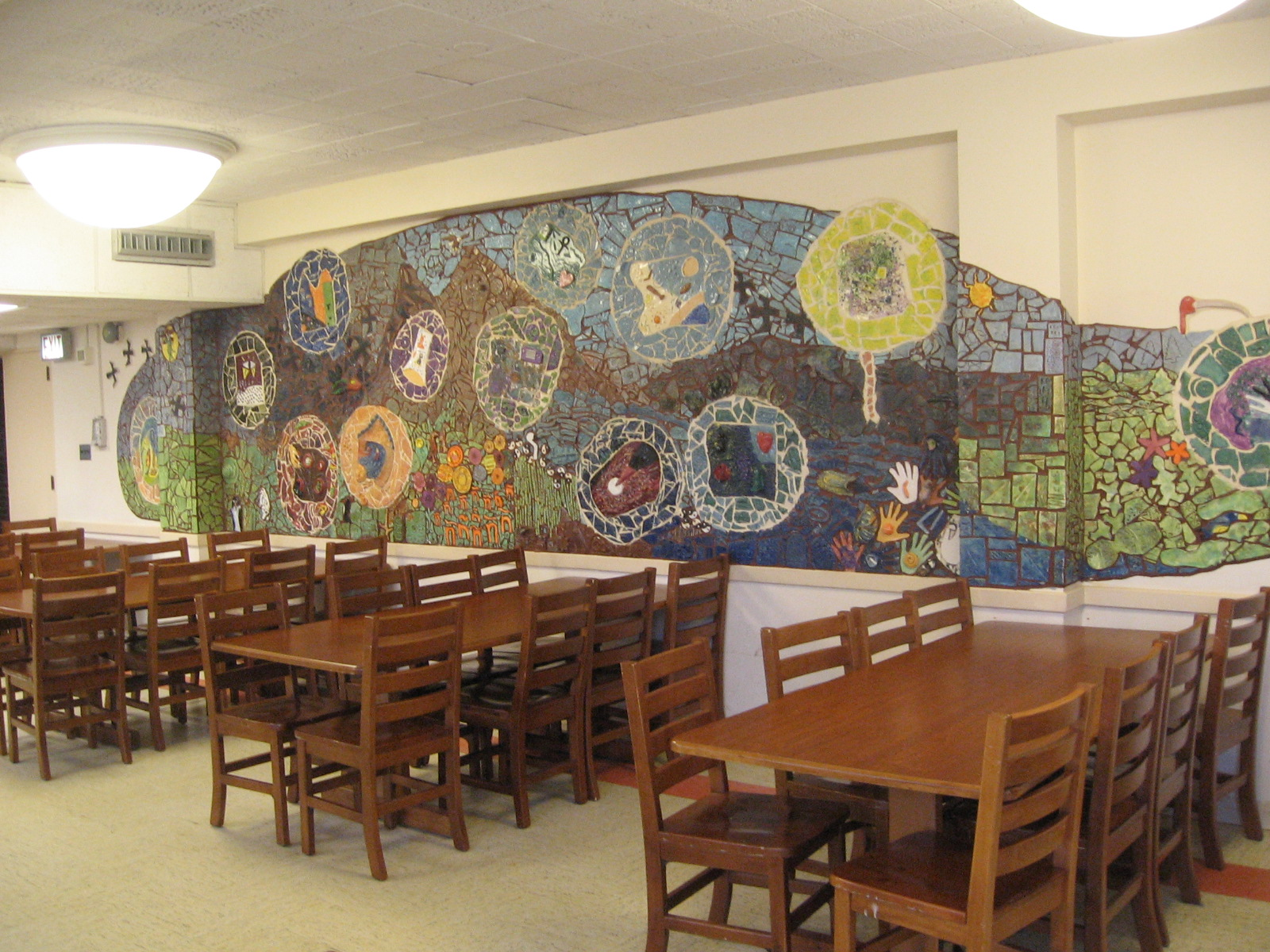
The dining room of the Orthogenic School

During the school week, students attended academic classes during the day and had the option of attending a variety of extra curricular activities in the early evening. Many high school and older middle school students attended departmentalized classes for most of the day. Younger students and students who cannot transition between classes received individualized and small group instruction in self-contained classrooms.

During their stay in the residential program, students gradually attained higher levels of privileges, freedoms, and responsibilities, however a formal level system was not used. Behavioral plans, goals, and treatment modalities are utilized on an individualized basis. Students attended one or two 45-minute individual therapy sessions per week and one 60 minute group therapy session per week. A variety of group therapy modalities are utilized such as social skills, process, anger management, transition planning, and depression and anxiety groups.

On March 29, 2021, the school announced the closing of the residential, original school at the end of the Spring term of 2021. Some students were allowed to remain longer as placements elsewhere were finalized. Many transitioned into the day school.

A day school program was established subsequent to the original residential program. In this, students can attend the school, in addition to receiving group and individual therapy services, but still live at home. The availability and usefulness of this program are decided on a case-by-case basis. The closing of the residential school coincides with the plan to expand the day school.

== Bettelheim's tenure (1944–1973) ==
=== Theory ===
The well-known and controversial psychoanalytic theorist Bruno Bettelheim served as director of the Orthogenic School during the mid-20th century (1944 to 1973). During the time he spent there the school became relatively well known for treating children with autism, a field in which Bettelheim studied.

Bettelheim's method of treating students was unusual for its time. Unlike most hospitals and asylums that functioned much like a medical facility, Bettelheim believed that treatment for mental illnesses should be fundamentally different from treating physical ailments. Doors at the Orthogenic School were always unlocked, and students could theoretically leave whenever they wanted to. Safety screens on windows were placed on the outside of the window rather than the inside, a bold move for a treatment center at the time. Before arriving at the school a student would have several visits to decide if they wanted to stay. Bettelheim wanted to ensure that a student wanted to attend the school, and would not take children who didn't want to go.

Counselors also resided with the students in bedrooms adjacent to their respective dormitories to give round-the-clock support. The counselors, like the students, also attended regular individual and group therapy sessions to allow them to analyze their own methods and thought to improve. This is a practice which continues to this day.

Bettelheim also believed that the Orthogenic School should feel like a home to the students. Furniture in the dormitories was usually antique and very expensive. Students in the dining rooms dined on imported china with metal silverware and glass cups, which was unusual for a treatment center. During the three renovations to the building which Bettelheim supervised, a number of art pieces were commissioned for the school by Bettelheim, including a mural by Jordi Bonet.

=== Practice ===
Sources vary as to whether Bettelheim's degree was in art history or philosophy (aesthetics); it was not in psychology. Ralph Tyler, who first brought Bettelheim to the University of Chicago, stated in 1990 that he assumed Bettelheim had two PhDs, one in art history and the other in psychology, and in some of his writings Bettelheim himself implied that he written a dissertation on the philosophy of education. A 1995 article in the UK's The Independent stated that Bettelheim "despite claims to the contrary, possessed no psychology qualifications of any sort." A 1997 article in the Chicago Tribune stated, "But when the directorship of the Orthogenic School became available, he evidently gambled that because of the war no one would be able to check on his credentials. . . when his transcript was posthumously examined, it showed that he had taken but three introductory courses in the field."

What Bettelheim learned of standard psychoanalytic practice, he seemed to have learned as a client. Bettelheim's first wife Gina took care of Patsy, a troubled American child, who lived in the Bettelheim home in Vienna for seven years. Bettelheim later claimed he had taken care of Patsy and that she was on the autism spectrum. There is disagreement among sources regarding whether or not Patsy was on the spectrum.

Later directors and some counselors at the Orthogenic School see Bettelheim merely as using corporal punishment even though he stated that such was counterproductive, while many but not all residential students report seeing rage and out-of-control violence on Bettelheim's part.

Richard Pollak's 1997 biography of Bettelheim states that two separate women reported that Bettelheim fondled their breasts and those of other female students at the school while he was ostensibly apologizing to each for beating her.

A 1990 Chicago Tribune article reported: "Of the 19 alumni of the Orthogenic School interviewed for this story, some are still bitterly angry at Bettelheim, 20 or 30 years after leaving the institution. Others say their stays did them good, and they express gratitude for having had the opportunity to be at the school. All agree that Bettelheim frequently struck his young and vulnerable patients. What is equally significant is that none of Bettelheim's successors at the Orthogenic School now contradicts these reports."

This same article reported abusive treatment, such as:
• That Bettelheim pulled an adolescent girl out of a shower and hit and berated her in front of dormitory mates.
• That he summoned another teenage girl from a toilet stall for a thrashing,
• That he did not allow a male student to take asthma medication, on the theory that asthma was psychologically caused
• Ronald Angres wrote in a Commentary magazine essay, "I lived for years in terror of his beatings, in terror of his footsteps in the dorms-in abject, animal terror."

== Former location ==
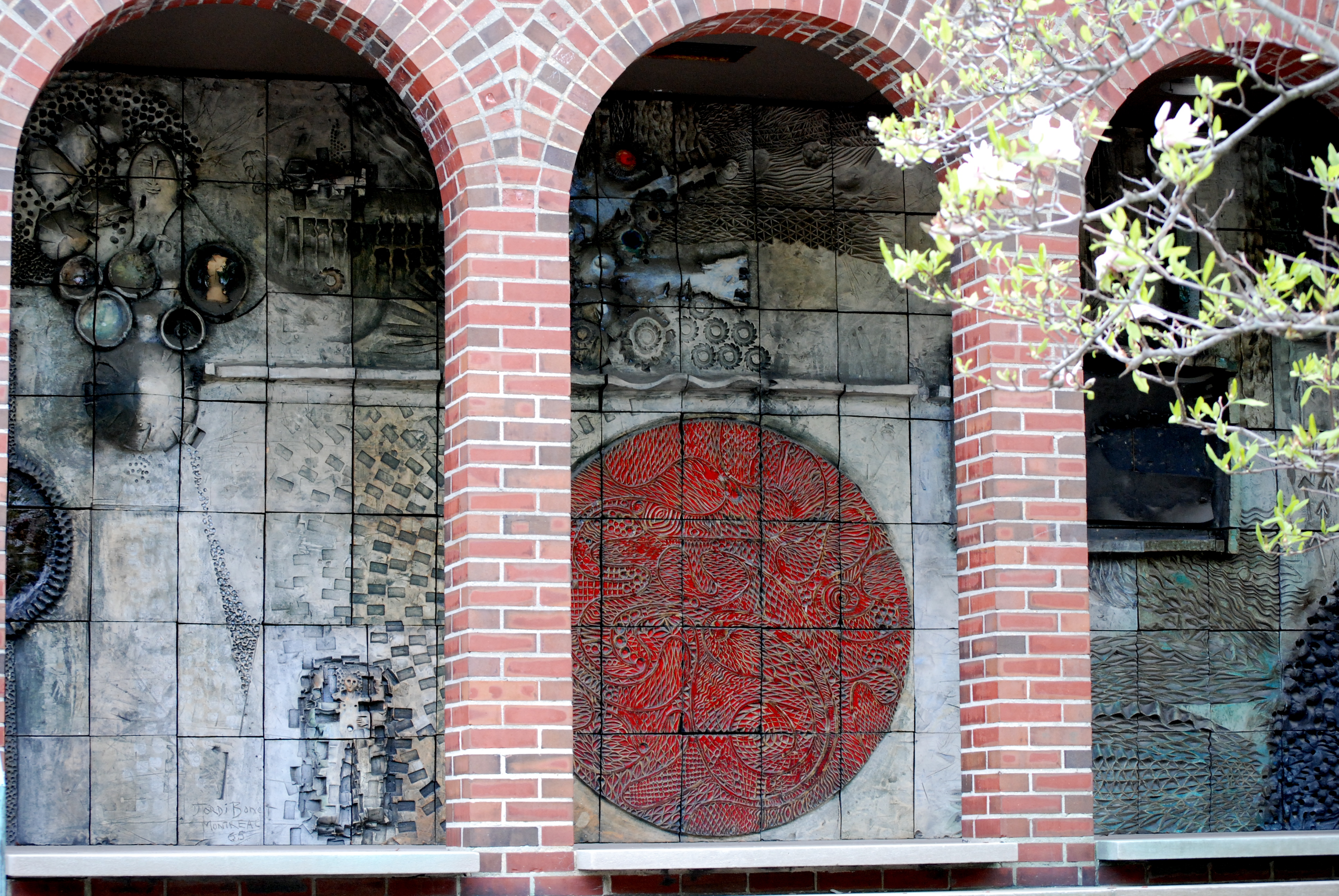
A mural at the Orthogenic School, created by Jordi Bonet

The school is approximately 85 years old and was located at 1365 E 60th St from the 1940s to 2014. The building in which the school resided was much older and had been restored and renovated several times since its occupation. The building itself consisted of three segments - a school wing, a dormitory wing, and a "transitional wing" which housed various student-used spaces. Parts of the building were also used by the Hyde Park Day School, a school for children with learning disabilities.

== Current location ==
In 2014, the O School moved buildings. The new building, like the previous one, is shared with Hyde Park Day School. It is located at 6245 South Ingleside Avenue in Chicago's West Woodlawn neighborhood.
