= List of alternative therapies for developmental and learning disabilities =

Discredited or unproven therapies

This list covers alternative therapies for developmental and learning disabilities. None of these therapies are supported by scientific evidence.

== Bioenergy therapies ==
- Bi-Aura therapy
- Craniosacral therapy
- Distant healing
- Electromagnetic Field (EMF) Balancing Technique
- magnetic field therapy
- therapeutic touch (TT) According to the American medical association, therapeutic touch is "little more than quackery".
- Thought Field Therapy (TFT)
- program practices for social development
- Alexander technique
- Chiropractic
- Feldenkreis
- Osteopathy
- Physiotherapy and occupational therapy for learning disabilities
- Pilates
- Yoga
- Zero Balancing

== Dietary treatments ==
- additive-free diets
- Antifungal medication
- Ayurvedic medicine
- B6-magnesium treatment
- Chelation therapy
- fatty acids
- Feingold Diet
- food allergies, multiple chemical sensitivities (diet base)
- Gluten-free, casein-free diet (GFCF)
- glyconutritional supplement
- herbal medicine
- iron
- lutein-free diet
- megavitamins
- refined sugar-free diet
- secretin treatment
- trace minerals, trace elements
- vaccination (avoidance)
- zinc

== Eclectic approaches ==
- Sunflower therapy

== Hearing therapies ==
- Auditory integration training (AIT), auditory processing training
- Mozart Effect
- music therapy
- Spectral Activated Music of Optimal Natural Structure (SAMONAS)
- The Tomatis Method

== Holistic healing ==
- Applied Kinesiology
- crystal therapy
- flower remedies
- homeopathy
- naturopathy

== Medical interventions ==
- anti-motion sickness medication and other types for Vestibular Dysfunction

== Movement-based therapies ==
- Brushing technique
- Developmental Exercise Programme (inhibition of primitive reflexes)
- Doman method
- (Psychomotor) patterning
- Dance Movement Therapy
- Physio-Neuro Therapy

== Pedagogical approaches and policies ==
- Full inclusion
- Gentle Teaching
- Person Centered Approach (PCA)

== Psychosocial interventions ==
- Floortime (aka DIR)
- holding therapy
- TEACCH

== Stress management ==
- caffeine-free diet
- Laughter therapy
- meditation
- positive thinking
- stress management

== Student profiling ==
- Learning styles

== Technological interventions ==
- Biofeedback
- Facilitated Communication

Several scientific studies have shown that facilitated communication is quackery by proving that what the Autistic patient "says" is influenced entirely by the facilitator.

- Fast ForWord

== Touch therapies ==
- acupressure
- acupuncture
- aromatherapy
- Bowen Technique
- Brushing and joint compression
- Emotional Freedom Technique
- massage
- reflexology
- Reiki

== Training methods ==
- Positive behavior support (PBS)
- Sensory integration therapy (SIT)
- Whole Language

== Visual approaches ==
- Asfedic Tuning (TintaVision)
- Coloured overlays
- Dunlop test
- Harris Filters
- Intuitive Colorimeter
- Irlen Syndrome
- Optim-Eyes
- Prism glasses
- Tinted lenses, ChromaGen lenses
- Visual Tracking Magnifier

== Emerging therapies ==
- Dolphin Assisted Therapy
- Hypnotherapy
- Light and Colour Therapy
