= Brenda Smith Myles =

American author and researcher

Brenda Smith Myles (born 1957) is an American author and researcher on the topic of the autism spectrum. As of 2021, she has written more than 300 articles and books on autism spectrum disorder. She was once found to be the world's second most productive applied researcher in ASD, by the University of Texas.

== Early life and education ==
Myles graduated with a Bachelor of Science (elementary education/special education) from the State University of New York at Old Westbury in 1985. The following year, she earned a Master of Science (special education, learning disabilities) from the University of Kansas. 1989 saw that university grant her a Ph.D. in special education, behavior disorders and learning disabilities. While studying, she gained practical experience working with children at the University of Kansas Medical Center.

== Career ==
After receiving her doctorate, she went joined the faculty of the Department of Special Education at her alma mater. While here, she undertook many research projects about young people with autism. She would eventually reach the rank of professor here.

In 1997, she became the editor of the journal Intervention in School and Clinic, remaining so until 2005.

In 2002, she was awarded the Autism Society of America (ASA) Outstanding Literary Work of the Year, for her co-authored book Asperger Syndrome and Adolescence: Practical Solutions for School Success. The ASA went on to award Myles their Wendy F. Miller Autism Professional of the Year Award in 2004. She became a spokesperson and chief program officer for the organization.

Myles became an American Occupational Therapy Association Scholar in 2007.

A 2011 survey of autism support professionals by Canadian organization, Autism Ontario, found that 34% had been influenced by Myles when devising their support programs.

In 2013, she became an American Academy of Pediatrics Autism Champion.

She became the president of AAPC Publishing in 2017, and has since ceased to be so.

Myles was also for a time a Scientific Council board member for the Organization for Autism Research (OAR) in Washington, D.C.

== Selected works ==
- Asperger syndrome : a guide for educators and parents, 1998
- Asperger syndrome and difficult moments : practical solutions for tantrums, rage, and meltdowns, 1999
- Asperger syndrome and sensory issues : practical solutions for making sense of the world, 2000
- Asperger syndrome and adolescence : practical solutions for school success, 2001
- Simple strategies that work! : helpful hints for all educators of students with Asperger syndrome, high-functioning autism, and related disabilities, 2001
- The hidden curriculum : practical solutions for understanding unstated rules in social situations, 2004
- Children and youth with Asperger syndrome : strategies for success in inclusive settings, 2005
