= Autism Society of America =

Non-profit organization in the USA

Autism Society of America Inc.
- Founded: 1965
- Founders: Bernard Rimland, Ruth C. Sullivan, and others
- Tax ID no.: 52-1020149
- Legal status: 501(c)(3) nonprofit organization
- Headquarters: Rockville, Maryland, United States
- Chair of the Board of Directors: Tracey Staley
- Chief Executive Officer: Joe Joyce
- Subsidiaries: Autism Society of America Foundation
- Revenue: $5,641,870 (2023)
- Expenses: $6,197,022 (2023)
- Endowment: $50,000 (2023)
- Employees: 43 (2023)
- Volunteers: 5 (2023)
- Website: www.autismsociety.org
- Formerly called: National Society for Autistic Children

The Autism Society of America (ASA) is an American non-profit organization whose stated goal is "to improve the lives of all affected by autism." It was founded in 1965 by Bernard Rimland together with Ruth C. Sullivan and a small group of other parents of autistic children. Its original name was the National Society for Autistic Children; the name was changed to emphasize that autistic children grow up.

== History ==
=== Vaccines and autism ===
In 1998, anti-vaccine activist Andrew Wakefield released a fraudulent study that falsely linked the MMR vaccine to autism (which was formally retracted by its publisher in 2010). Subsequent to its release, other scientifically unsupported theories (including "vaccine overload" and the bodies of autistic children being unable to eliminate thiomersal) increased in popularity. In the decades since, the ASA and its state and regional chapters have platformed, honored or elevated to leadership individuals who have made these or other unsupported claims (including those who have falsely argued or speculated that autistic children could widely benefit from chelation or other detoxification therapies). This has included the following individuals:

- James B. Adams
- Kenneth A. Bock
- James Jeffrey Bradstreet
- Doreen Granpeesheh
- Martha Herbert
- Bryan L. Jepson
- Daniel A. Rossignol
- Jeff Sell, Esq.
- Stephen Shore
- Lauren W. Underwood

In 2016, Adams used his position as president of the Autism Society of Greater Phoenix to promote the release of Wakefield's anti-vaccination film, Vaxxed, and told the Phoenix New Times that he believed vaccines could cause autism in rare cases. As of 2025, Adams still sits on the chapter's board of directors and serves as a scientific advisor to the Rimland-founded Autism Research Institute.

Granpeesheh and Jepson were openly associated with the Wakefield-founded Thoughtful House Center for Children at the time they appeared at various ASA annual conferences in the mid- to late 2000s, and Granpeesheh appeared in Vaxxed in 2016. Granpeesheh last sat on the ASA's national board of directors in 2009, and she and Herbert were most recently credited as advisors to the ASA in its 2021 annual report.

In 2003, while serving on the ASA's national board of directors, Shore told USA Today that vaccines and thiomersal were potential catalysts for autism and that he believed autistic traits closely resembled the symptoms of mercury poisoning. Shore also said he believed that removing thiomersal from vaccines was a positive step, "Because you shouldn't be injecting mercury into anyone." In the 2006 book Understanding Autism for Dummies, Shore and his co-authors falsely speculated that the appearance of autistic traits in toddlerhood might be caused by certain vaccines (such as the MMR vaccine), certain vaccine ingredients (such as thiomersal) or too many vaccines given within a short period and suggested parents consider an alternative vaccination schedule.

The ASA platformed Wakefield, himself, at its 2007 annual conference.

In March 2019, the ASA made a formal statement affirming that there was "never any credible medical or scientific evidence linking vaccinations with autism" and that vaccines were "safe, effective, and life-saving." In April 2025, ASA leadership cosigned an open letter affirming that there was no causal link between vaccines and autism in response to controversial statements made by U.S. Secretary of Health and Human Services and anti-vaccine activist Robert F. Kennedy Jr.

=== Branding ===
The ASA and its state and regional chapters have historically utilized controversial puzzle-piece imagery in their branding, including a trademarked puzzle-piece ribbon (introduced in 1999) and a graphic of a boy's head interwoven with puzzle pieces. Some critics and researchers claim these types of symbols stigmatize autistic people because they portray them as incomplete, mysterious or a problem in need of fixing and evoke brokenness and bafflement.

In 2021, the ASA announced it was removing puzzle-piece imagery from its branding and had chosen a new logo consisting of interwoven, multicolored lines ("threads"), which the organization believed would emphasize "connection" and "create a calm, visual stimulation." As of 2025, the ASA has not fully retired its trademarked puzzle-piece ribbon.

== Founders ==
=== Bernard Rimland ===
Bernard Rimland (November 15, 1928 – November 21, 2006) was an American research psychologist, writer, lecturer, and influential person in the field of developmental disorders who is known for promoting autism-related pseudoscience. In 1964, Bernard Rimland wrote a book, Infantile Autism, that convinced others working in the field that autism is a physiological disorder, not a mental or emotional problem. Rimland was a founder of the ASA in 1965, but left to create the Autism Research Institute in 1967. He later promoted several theories, which have since been disproven, about the causes and treatment of autism, including vaccine denial, facilitated communication, chelation therapy, and claims of a link between secretin and autism. Rimland eventually returned to ASA leadership, last serving as an honorary member of the organization's board of directors the year he died.

=== Ruth C. Sullivan ===
Ruth C. Sullivan (April 20, 1924 – September 16, 2021) was an American organizer and advocate for the education of autistic people. Sullivan was a founder and the first president of the ASA, but later left to start the Autism Services Center in Huntington, West Virginia. Sullivan eventually returned to ASA leadership, last serving as an honorary member of the organization's board of directors in 2008.
