= Environmental toxicology =

Multidisciplinary field of science

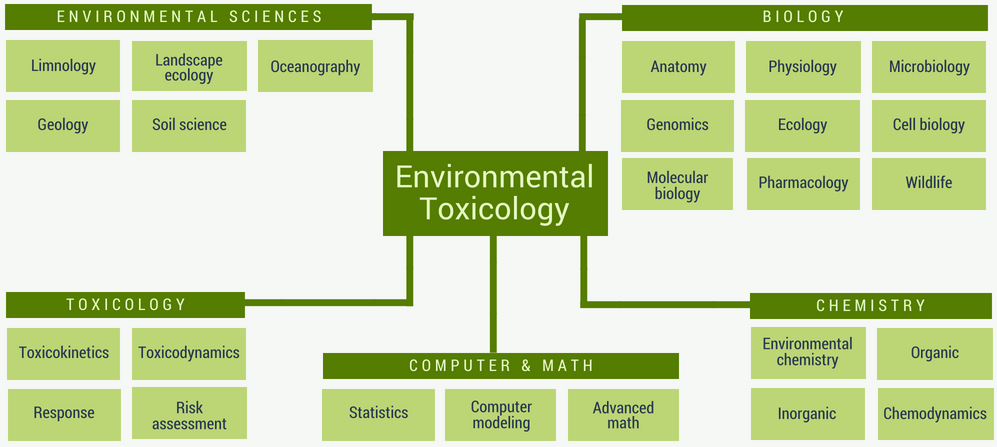
Overview of the interdisciplinarity of environmental toxicology

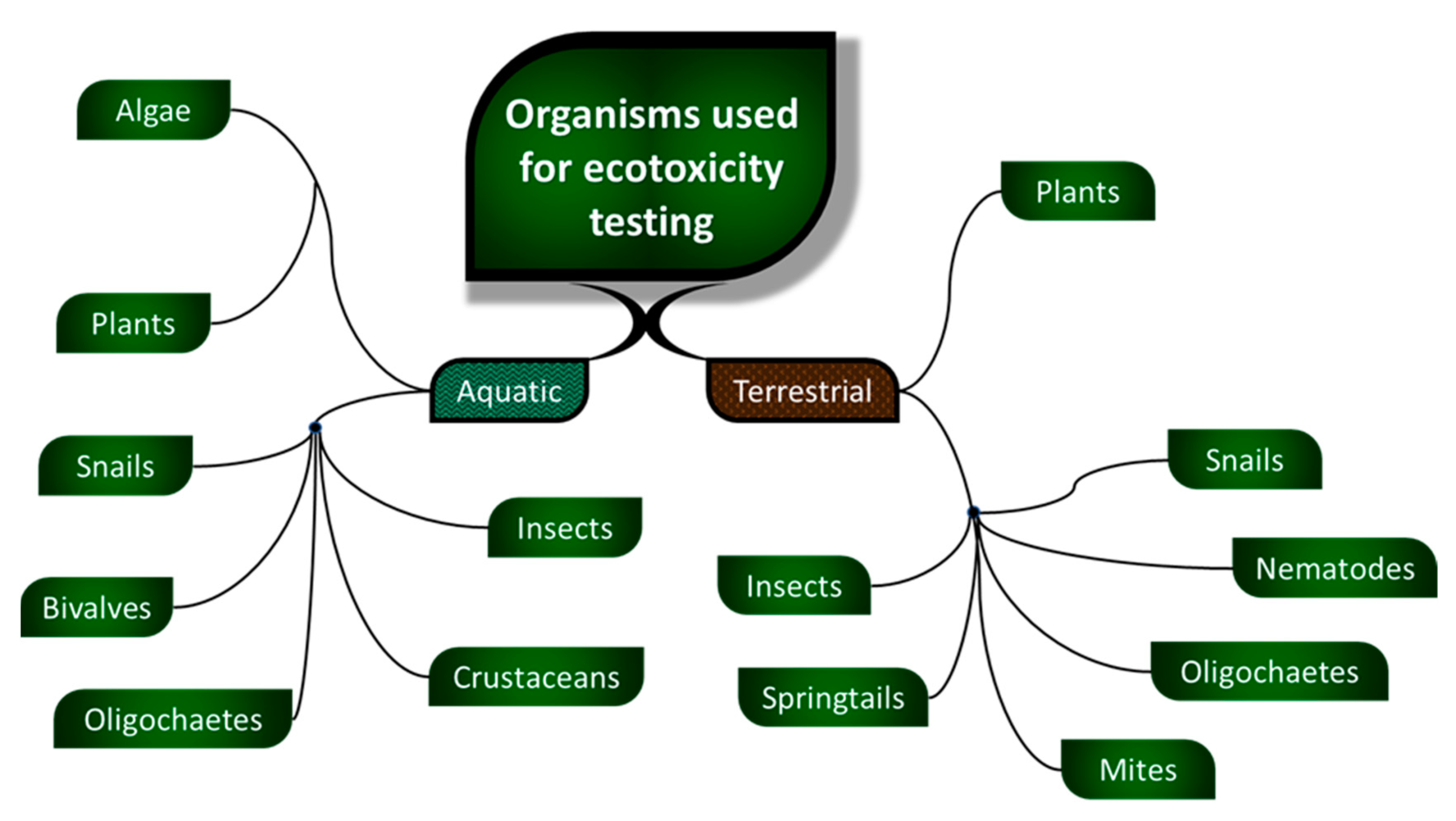
Categories of organisms commonly used for assessing environmental toxicity

Environmental toxicology is a multidisciplinary field of science concerned with the study of the harmful effects of various chemical, biological and physical agents on living organisms. Ecotoxicology is a subdiscipline of environmental toxicology concerned with studying the harmful effects of toxicants at the population and ecosystem levels.

Rachel Carson is considered the mother of environmental toxicology, as she made it a distinct field within toxicology in 1962 with the publication of her book Silent Spring, which covered the effects of uncontrolled pesticide use. Carson's book was based extensively on a series of reports by Lucille Farrier Stickel on the ecological effects of the pesticide DDT.

Organisms can be exposed to various kinds of toxicants at any life cycle stage, some of which are more sensitive than others. Toxicity can also vary with the organism's placement within its food web. Bioaccumulation occurs when an organism stores toxicants in fatty tissues, which may eventually establish a trophic cascade and the biomagnification of specific toxicants. Biodegradation releases carbon dioxide and water as by-products into the environment. This process is typically limited in areas affected by environmental toxicants.

Harmful effects of such chemical and biological agents as toxicants from pollutants, insecticides, pesticides, and fertilizers can affect an organism and its community by reducing its species diversity and abundance. Such changes in population dynamics affect the ecosystem by reducing its productivity and stability.

On individual level, these toxins can cause severe health effects such as allergic reaction, stomachache and diarrhea, and death.

Although legislation implemented since the early 1970s had intended to minimize harmful effects of environmental toxicants upon all species, McCarty (2013) has warned that "longstanding limitations in the implementation of the simple conceptual model that is the basis of current aquatic toxicity testing protocols" may lead to an impending environmental toxicology "dark age".

== Governing policies on environmental toxicity ==
=== U.S. policies ===
To protect the environment, the National Environmental Policy Act (NEPA) was written. The main point that NEPA brings to light is that it "assures that all branches of government give proper consideration to the environment prior to undertaking any major federal actions that significantly affect the environment." This law was passed in 1970 and also founded the Council on Environmental Quality (CEQ). The importance of CEQ was that it helped further push policy areas.

CEQ created environmental programs including the Federal Water Pollution Control Act, Toxic Substance Control Act, Resources Conservation and Recovery Act (RCRA and the Safe). CEQ was essential in creating the foundation for most of the "current environmental legislation except for Superfund and asbestos control legislation."

Some initial impacts of NEPA pertain to the interpretation within Courts. Not only did Courts interpret NEPA to expand over direct environmental impacts from any projects, specifically federal, but also indirect actions from federal projects.

==== Toxic Substance Control Act ====
TSCA, also known as the Toxic Substance Control Act, is a federal law that regulates industrial chemicals that have the potential to be harmful to humans and the environment. TSCA specifically targets "the manufacture, importation, storage, use, disposal, and degradation of chemicals in commercial use." The EPA allows the following to be done: "1. Pre-manufacture testing of chemicals to determine health or environmental risk 2. Review of chemicals for significant risk prior to the start of commercial production 3. Restriction or prohibition on the production or disposal of certain chemicals 4. Import and export control of chemicals prior to their entering or leaving the USA."

==== The Clean Air Act ====
The Clean Air Act was aided by the signing of the 1990 amendments. These amendments protected reducing acid, the ozone layer, improving air quality and toxic pollutants. The Clean Air Act was actually revised and with, support from President George H.W Bush, it was signed in. The biggest major threats that this act targets are: urban air pollution, toxic air emissions, stratospheric ozone, acid rain etc. Apart from targeting these specific areas, it also established a national operating that "permits program to make the law more workable, and strengthened enforcement to help ensure better compliance with the Act."

=== Regulations and enforcement actions on polychlorinated biphenyls ===
As mentioned above, though the United States did ban the use of polychlorinated biphenyls (PCBs), there is the possibility that they are present in products made before the PCB ban in 1979. The Environmental Protection Agency (EPA) released its ban on PCBs on April 19, 1979. According to the EPA, "Although PCBs are no longer being produced in this country, we will now bring under control the vast majority of PCBs still in use," said EPA Administrator Douglas M. Castle. "This will help prevent further contamination of our air, water and food supplies from a toxic and very persistent man-made chemical."

PCBs has been tested on laboratory animals and have caused cancer and birth defects. PCB is suspected of having certain effects on liver and skin of humans. They are also suspected of causing cancer as well. EPA "estimates that 150 million pounds of PCBs are dispersed throughout the environment, including air and water supplies; an additional 290 million pounds are located in landfills in this country." Again, even though they have been banned, there is still a large amount of PCBs are circulating within the environment and are possibly causing effects on the skin and liver of humans.

There were some cases in which people or companies that disposed of PCBs incorrectly. Up until now, there have been four cases in which EPA had to take legal actions against people/companies for their methods of disposal. The two cases involving the companies, were fined $28,600 for improper disposal. It is unknown what fined was charged against the three people for "illegally dumping PCBs along 210 miles of roadway in North Carolina."

Though PCBs were banned, there are some exceptions where they are being used. The area in which it has been completely prohibited is "the manufacture, processing, distribution in commerce, and "non-enclosed" (open to the environment) uses of PCBs unless specifically authorized or exempted by EPA. "Totally enclosed" uses (contained, and therefore exposure to PCBs is unlikely) will be allowed to continue for the life of the equipment." In terms of electrical equipment containing PCBs is allowed under specific controlled conditions. Out of the 750 million pounds of PCBs, electrical equipment represents 578 million pounds. Any new manufacture of PCB is prohibited.

== Sources of environmental toxicity ==
There are many sources of environmental toxicity that can lead to the presence of toxicants in our food, water and air. These sources include organic and inorganic pollutants, pesticides and biological agents, all of which can have harmful effects on living organisms. There can be so called point sources of pollution, for instance the drains from a specific factory, but also non-point sources (diffuse sources) like the rubber from car tires that contain numerous chemicals and heavy metals that are spread in the environment.

=== PCBs ===
PCBs are organic pollutants that are still present in our environment today, despite being banned in many countries, including the United States and Canada. Due to the persistent nature of PCBs in aquatic ecosystems, many aquatic species contain high levels of this chemical. For example, wild salmon (Salmo salar) in the Baltic Sea have been shown to have significantly higher PCB levels than farmed salmon as the wild fish live in a heavily contaminated environment.

PCBs pertains to a group of human-produced "organic chemicals known as Chlorinated hydrocarbons" The chemical and physical properties of a PCS determine the quantity and location chlorine and unlike other chemicals, they have no form of identification. The range of toxicity is not consistent and because PCBs have certain properties ( chemical stability, non-flammability) they have been used in a colossal amount of commercial and industrial practices. Some of those include, "Electrical, heat transfer and hydraulic equipment, plasticizers in paints, plastics and rubber products and pigments, dyes and carbonless copy paper" to name a few.

=== Heavy metals ===
Metals like cadmium, mercury, and lead have minimal roles in living organisms if any, so the accumulation of these, even if a little, can lead to health issues.

For example, because humans consume fish, it is important to monitor fishes for such trace metals. It has been known for a long time that these trace metals get passed up the food web because of their lack of biodegradability or capability to break down. Such build-up can lead to liver damage and cardiovascular diseases in people. It is also important to monitor fishes not just for public health, but also to assess the health of coastal ecosystems.

For instance, it has been shown that fish (i.e. rainbow trout) exposed to higher cadmium levels and grow at a slower rate than fish exposed to lower levels or none. Moreover, cadmium can potentially alter the productivity and mating behaviours of these fish.

Heavy metals can also alter the genetic makeup in aquatic organisms. In Canada, a study examined genetic diversity in wild yellow perch along various heavy metal concentration gradients in lakes polluted by mining operations. Researchers wanted to determine what effect metal contamination had on evolutionary responses among populations of yellow perch. Along the gradient, genetic diversity over all loci was negatively correlated with liver cadmium contamination. Additionally, there was a negative correlation observed between copper contamination and genetic diversity. Some aquatic species have evolved heavy metal tolerances. In response to high heavy metal concentrations a Dipteran species, Chironomus riparius, of the midge family, Chironomidae, has evolved to become tolerant to cadmium toxicity in aquatic environments. Altered life histories, increased cadmium excretion, and sustained growth under cadmium exposure is evidence that shows that C. riparius exhibits genetically based heavy metal tolerance.

Additionally, a case study in China looked at the concentrations of Cu (copper), Cr (chromium), Cd (cadmium), and Pb (lead) in the edible parts of the fishes Pelteobagrus fluvidraco, the banded catfish, and Cyprinus carpio, the common carp living in Taihu Lake. These metals were actively being released from sources such as industrial waste stemming from agriculture and mining and then going into coastal ecosystems and becoming stored in the local fish, especially their organs. This was especially alarming because too much copper consumption can lead to diarrhea and nausea in humans and liver damage in fish. Additionally, too much lead can lead to defects in learning, behavior, metabolism, and growth in some vertebrates, including humans. Much of these heavy metals were found in the two fish species' liver, kidney, and gills, however, their concentrations were fortunately found to be below the threshold amount for human consumption made by the Chinese Food Health Criterion. Overall, the study showed that the remediation efforts here did in fact reduce the amount of heavy metals built up in the fish.

Generally speaking, the specific rate of build-up of metals in fish depends on the metal, the fish species, the aquatic environment, the time of year, and fishes' organs. For example, metals are more commonly known to be found the most in carnivorous species with omnivorous species following behind. In this case, perhaps due to the properties of the water differing at different parts of the year, there were more heavy metals spotted in the two fish species in the summer compared to the winter. Overall, it is relatively understood that the amount of metals in the liver and kidney of a fish represents the amount that has been actively stored in their bodies whereas the amount of metals in the gills represents the amount that has been accumulated from the surrounding water. This is why the gills are thought to be better bioindicators of metal pollution.

=== Radiation ===
Radiation is given off by matter as either rays or waves of pure energy or high-speed particles. Rays or waves of energy, also known as electromagnetic radiation, include sunlight, X-rays, radar, and radio waves. Particle radiation includes alpha and beta particles and neutrons. When humans and animals are exposed to high radiation levels, they can develop cancer, congenital disabilities, or skin burns. Plants also face problems when exposed to large levels of radiation. After the Chernobyl disaster in 1986, the nuclear radiation damaged the surrounding plants' reproductive tissues, and it took approximately three years for these plans to regain their reproductive abilities. The study of radiation and its effects on the environment is known as radioecology.

=== Metals toxicity ===
The most known or common types of heavy metals include zinc, arsenic, copper, lead, nickel, chromium, aluminum, and cadmium. All of these types cause certain risks on human and environment health.

Though certain amount of these metals can actually have an important role in, for example, maintaining certain biochemical and physiological, "functions in living organisms when in very low concentrations, however they become noxious when they exceed certain threshold concentrations." Heavy metal are a huge part of environmental pollutions and their toxicity "is a problem of increasing significance for ecological, evolutionary, nutritional and environmental reasons."

Aluminum

Aluminum is the most common natural metal in the Earth's crust and is naturally cycled throughout the environment via processes like the weathering of rocks and volcano eruptions. Those natural processes release more aluminum into the freshwater environments than do humans, but anthropogenic impact has been causing values to rise above the recommended amount by the U.S. EPA and World Health Organization. Aluminum is used commonly in industrially-made items like paints, paper, household appliances, packaging, processing of food and water, and for health care items like antiperspirants and vaccine production. Run-off from those industrial uses then bring the metal flowing into the environment.

Generally, too much exposure to aluminum affects motor and cognitive skills. In mammals, the metal has been shown to affect gene expression, DNA repair, and DNA binding. One study showed how the effects of aluminum include neurodegeneration and nerve cell death in mice. Another study has shown it to be related to human diseases associated with the nervous system such as Alzheimer's and Parkinson's disease and autism.

Exposure to contaminants can change the tissues of marine life like fish too. For example, its accumulation has been shown to cause neurodegeneration in cerebral regions of the brains such as those of O. mossambicus, otherwise known as Mozambique tilapia. Aluminum also decreases locomotive abilities of fishes since aluminum is thought to negatively impact with their oxygen supply. Finally, the metal causes slow responses to arousal and other environmental stimuli, overall abnormal behavior, and changes with the neurotransmitters in their bodies such as adrenaline and dopamine.

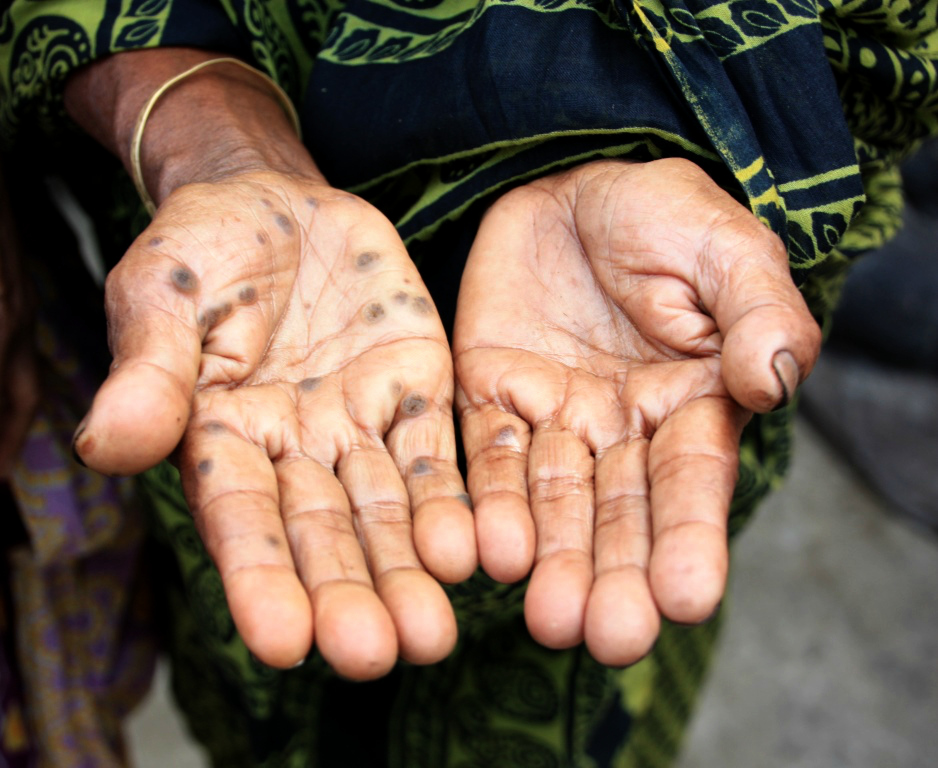
Person has been exposed to arsenic poisoning through contaminated water

==== Arsenic ====
Arsenic, one of the most important heavy metals, causes ecological problems and health issues in humans. It is "semimetallic property, is prominently toxic and carcinogenic, and is extensively available in the form of oxides or sulfides or as a salt of iron, sodium, calcium, copper, etc." It is also one of the most abundant elements on earth and its specific inorganic forms are very dangerous to living creatures (animals, plants, and humans) and the environment.

In humans, arsenic can cause cancer in the bladder, skin, lungs and liver. One of the major sources of arsenic exposure in humans is contaminated water, which is a problem in more than 30 countries in the world.

Humans tend to encounter arsenic by "natural means, industrial source, or from unintended sources." Water can become contaminated by arsenical pesticides or natural arsenical chemicals. There are some cases in which arsenic has been used in suicide attempts and can result in acute poisoning. Arsenic "is a protoplastic poison since it affects primarily the sulphydryl group of cells causing malfunctioning of cell respiration, cell enzymes and mitosis."

==== Lead ====
Another extremely toxic metal, lead, can and has been known to cause "extensive environmental contamination and health problems in many parts of the world." The physical appearance of lead is bright and silver-colored metal.

Lead emissions in the United States have decreased significantly since gas stations no longer sell leaded gasoline. Total emissions declined from over 200,000 tons per year in 1970 to approximately 5,000 tons per year by 1990 and have dropped since then due to tighter industrial air pollution controls. However, past use of leaded gasoline has contributed to lead present in soil.

Some sources of lead pollution in the environment include metal plating, fishing operations, soil waste, factory chimneys, smelting of ores, wastes from battery industries, paint, agrochemicals, and legacy lead-based infrastructure such as old plumbing and paints.

Lead enters the body primarily through inhalation or ingestion of contaminated air, food, water, or soil from these sources. Lead can have multiple effects on the body's systems, including the central and peripheral nervous systems.

Someone who has come in contact with lead can have either acute or chronic lead poisoning. Those who experience acute poisoning have symptoms such as loss of appetite, headache, hypertension, abdominal pain, renal dysfunction, fatigue, sleeplessness, arthritis, hallucinations, and vertigo. Chronic exposure, on the other hand, can cause more severe symptoms such as "intellectual impairment, congenital disabilities, psychosis, autism, allergies, dyslexia, weight loss, hyperactivity, paralysis, muscular weakness, brain damage, kidney damage and may even cause death." Education, stricter environmental policies, and regular testing of soil, water, and consumer products are key preventative measures to decrease lead exposure.

==== Mercury ====
Mercury, a shiny silver-white, can transform into a colorless and odorless gas when heated up. Mercury highly affects the marine environment and there have been many studies conducted on the effects on the water environment. The biggest sources of mercury pollution include "agriculture, municipal wastewater discharges, mining, incineration, and discharges of industrial wastewater" all relatively connected to water.

Mercury exists in three different forms and all three possess different levels of bioavailability and toxicity. The three forms include organic compounds, metallic elements and inorganic salts. As stated above, they are present in water resources such as oceans, rivers and lakes. Studies have shown that mercury turns into methylmercury (MeHg) and seeps into the environment. Plankton then get the metal into their system, and they are then eaten by other marine organisms. This cycle continues up the food web. This process is called biomagnification and "causes significant disturbance to aquatic lives."

Mercury hurts marine life but can also be very hurtful towards humans' nervous system. Higher levels of mercury exposure can change many brain functions. It can "lead to shyness, tremors, memory problems, irritability, and changes in vision or hearing." Furthermore, breathing in mercury can lead to dysfunction in sensory and mental capabilities in humans as well such as with the use of one's motor skills, cognition, and sight.

Because of these worrying side effects, there was a study done in the Pacific coast of Columbia to assess the levels of mercury in the environment and in the people living there from gold-mining. The researchers found that the median total mercury concentration in hair measured from people living in two communities, Quibdo and Paimado, was 1.26$\mu$g/g and 0.67 $\mu$g/g respectively. Residents in other areas of Columbia have been found to have similar levels. These levels are greater than the recommended threshold values held by the U.S. Environmental Protection Agency (EPA). In addition, they measured the concentration of mercury found in fish living nearby in the Atrato River. Even though the concentration was determined to have a low risk factor for human health and consumption, the concentration (0.5 g/g) was above the World Health Organization's (WHO) recommended threshold.

They also determined that approximately 44% of the total sites around the river had a moderate level of pollution, further emphasizing that more intervention programs should be conducted to curb the seepage of mercury into the environment. This was a major concern especially since the Choco region is a biodiversity hotspot for all manner of organisms, not just humans. In the end, the highest levels of total airborne mercury were found to be in the gold shops downtown, further emphasizing the cost of gold-mining in such native communities and the need for better programs directed towards preventing its spread.

==== Cadmium ====
According to, ATSDR ranking, cadmium is the 7th most toxic heavy metal. Cadmium is interesting in that once it is exposed to humans (at work) or animals in their environment, it will accumulate inside the body throughout the life of the human/animal. Though cadmium was used as replacement for tin in WWI and pigment in paint industries back in the day, currently it is seen mostly in rechargeable batteries, tobacco smoke and some alloys production.

As stated by the Agency for Toxic Substance and Disease Registry, in " the US, more than 500,000 workers get exposed to toxic cadmium each year." It is also stated that the highest exposure to cadmium can be seen in China and Japan.

The effects of cadmium on the kidney and bones is huge. It can cause bone mineralization which "is the process of laying down minerals on a matrix of the bone". This can happen through renal dysfunction or bone damage.

===== Chromium =====
The 7th most abundant element, chromium, can occur naturally when one burns oil and coal and is released into the environment through sewage and fertilizers. Chromium usage can be seen in, "industries such as metallurgy, electroplating, production of paints and pigments, tanning, wood preservation, chemical production and pulp and paper production." Chromium toxicity affects the "biological processes in various plants such as maize, wheat, barley, cauliflower, citrullus and in vegetables. Chromium toxicity causes chlorosis and necrosis in plants."

=== Pesticides ===
Pesticides are a major source of environmental toxicity. These chemically synthesized agents have been known to persist in the environment long after their administration. The poor biodegradability of pesticides can result in bioaccumulation of chemicals in various organisms along with biomagnification within a food web. Pesticides can be categorized according to the pests they target. Insecticides are used to eliminate agricultural pests that attack various fruits and crops. Herbicides target herbal pests such as weeds and other unwanted plants that reduce crop production.

Pesticides in general have been shown to negatively impact the reproductive and endocrine systems of various reptiles and amphibians, so much that it is cautiously thought to be one of the main factors behind the decline in their populations all over the world. These pesticides impair their immune, nervous, behavioral systems including causing lower fertility rates, abnormal hormone levels, and lower fitness of offspring. Amphibians are thought to be especially in low decline because the release of agricultural pesticides is simultaneous with the secretion of pheromones during their season of reproduction. For instance, it has been demonstrated that greater quantities of pesticides correlates with greater number of defects in toads.

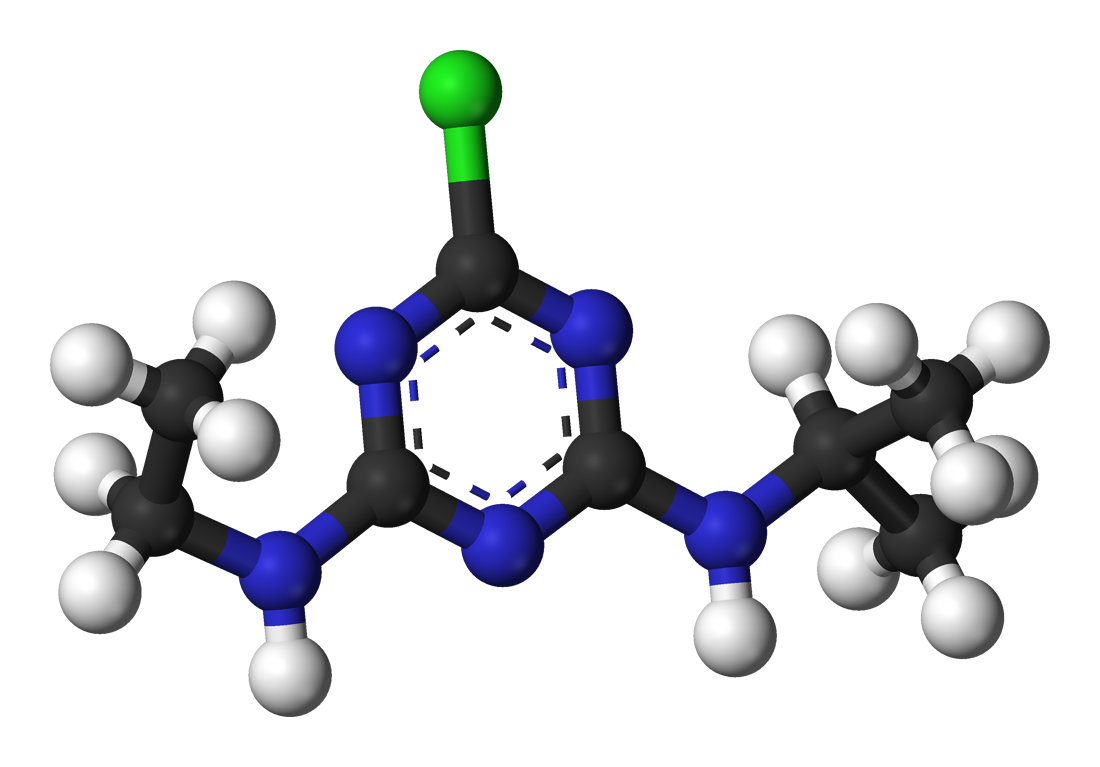
This is a 3D model of the herbicide atrazine.

For example, the chloroacetanilide class of herbicides is used worldwide in the control of weeds and grasses for agriculture. They are mainly used for crops such as corn, rice, soybean, sunflower, cotton, among others and are able to stay in the environment for long periods of time. Thus they can be found in soil, groundwater, and surface water due to soil erosion, leaching, and surface runoff. The amount of time they stay in the environment depends on the soil type and climate conditions like temperature and moisture. Chloroacetanilide herbicides include acetochlor, alachlor, among others. They are all listed as B2, L2, and C classes of carcinogens by the U.S. EPA.

Another herbicide called atrazine is still commonly used throughout the world even with the European Union banning its usage in 2005. Shockingly, its use was still prevalent in the U.S. in 2016 and in Australia for some time. Because it can dissolve in water, many concerns have been raised about its potential to contaminate soil and water along the surface and ground. Various studies have been conducted to determine the impact of atrazine on wildlife.

For example, studies have shown it to cause stunted growth and suppress or damage the immune and reproductive systems of aquatic life. It also is linked to cancer not only in fish, but also in mammals like humans. Additionally, atrazine is known to induce aromatase which causes the bodies of fish and amphibians to produce estrogen even when they are not supposed to. The herbicide also causes changes in gene expression which can be passed down from parent to offspring and get in the way of thyroid homeostasis. For example, a study done on male African clawed frogs show that exposure to atrazine led to smaller testicular size and lower testosterone levels. Another study done with the Northern leopard frog and Blanchard's cricket frog found that atrazine lowered their success with metamorphosis, the process of turning into an adult frog from the initial stage of a tadpole. This makes sense since metamorphosis is controlled by hormones from the thyroid gland which atrazine is known to negatively impact.

Furthermore, a study was done to study the effects of atrazine on freshwater crayfish Cherax destructor from the Czech Republic, a keystone species. They found that the hepatopancreas, the body part that serves as both the liver and pancreas in these crustaceans, became damaged after being exposed. A build-up of lactate and ammonia also resulted, leading to liver failure, tissue hypoxia, lactic acidosis, muscle fatigue, and pain. There was also damage and even deterioration of the gills however they were able to heal after 2 weeks. Damage to gills was also found in the bivalve Diplodon expansus.

==== DDT ====
Dichlorodiphenyltrichloroethane (DDT) is an organochlorine insecticide that has been banned due to its adverse effects on both humans and wildlife. DDT's insecticidal properties were first discovered in 1939. Following this discovery, DDT was widely used by farmers in order to kill agricultural pests such as the potato beetle, codling moth and corn earworm. In 1962, the harmful effects of the widespread and uncontrolled use of DDT were detailed by Rachel Carson in her book The Silent Spring. Such large quantities of DDT and its metabolite dichlorodiphenyldichloroethylene (DDE) that were released into the environment were toxic to both animals and humans.

DDT is not easily biodegradable and thus the chemical accumulates in soil and sediment runoff. Water systems become polluted and marine life such as fish and shellfish accumulate DDT in their tissues. Furthermore, this effect is amplified when animals who consume the fish also consume the chemical, demonstrating biomagnification within the food web. The process of biomagnification has detrimental effects on various bird species because DDT and DDE accumulate in their tissues inducing egg-shell thinning. Rapid declines in bird populations have been seen in Europe and North America as a result.

Humans who consume animals or plants that are contaminated with DDT experience adverse health effects. Various studies have shown that DDT has damaging effects on the liver, nervous system and reproductive system of humans.

By 1972, the United States Environmental Protection Agency (EPA) banned the use of DDT in the United States. Despite the regulation of this pesticide in North America, it is still used in certain areas of the world. Traces of this chemical have been found in noticeable amounts in a tributary of the Yangtze River in China, suggesting the pesticide is still in use in this region.

Though DDT was banned in 1972, some of the pesticide (as well as other chemical) lingered in the environment. This lingering of toxic material led to the near extinction of peregrine falcon. There was high levels of DDT were found in many areas such as "eggs, fat and tissues of the bird." The government . worked with conservation groups in helping them breed out of the contaminated area. Finally, in 1999 the birds were taken off the U.S endangered species list.

==== Sulfuryl fluoride ====
Sulfuryl fluoride is an insecticide that is broken down into fluoride and sulfate when released into the environment. Fluoride has been known to negatively affect aquatic wildlife. Elevated levels of fluoride have been proven to impair the feeding efficiency and growth of the common carp (Cyprinus carpio). Exposure to fluoride alters ion balance, total protein and lipid levels within these fish, which changes their body composition and disrupts various biochemical processes.

==== PFAS chemicals ====
Per and poly fluoroalkyl substances, known as PFAS, are a group of approximately 15 000 chemicals. The common structure of these chemicals involves a functional group and a long carbon tail that is fully or partially fluorinated. The first PFAS chemical, polytetrafluoroethylene (PTFE), was accidentally synthesized in 1938 by DuPont researcher Roy J. Plunkett while making refrigerants. The chemical was found to have unique and useful properties such as resistance to water, oil, and extreme temperatures. In 1945 DuPont patented this chemical, along with other PFAS chemicals like PFOA with the now household name, Teflon. American multinational conglomerate 3M began mass producing Teflon in 1947. Then in the 1960's, the US navy and 3M created a new type of fire-fighting foam using PFAS chemicals, "aqueous film-forming foam" or AFFF, which was then shipped around the world and used at airports, military sites, and fire-fighting training centers. The chemicals are now used in many household products including nail polish, makeup, shampoos, soaps, toothpastes, menstrual products, clothes, contact lenses and toilet paper. The chemicals are also used in fracking, artificial grass, lubricants (mechanical, industrial and bicycle), food packaging, magazines, pesticides, refrigerants, and even surgically implanted medical devices.

These chemicals have been given the nickname "forever chemicals" due to their extreme stability and resistance to natural degradation in the environment. They also bioaccumulate in humans and animals, with many of the PFAS chemicals having half-lives of several years. The also "biomagnify", so animals higher in the food chain tend to have higher concentration of the chemicals in their blood. PFAS has been found in almost all human blood samples tested, one study found 97% of Americans has PFAS in their blood. PFAS chemicals have been linked to high cholesterol, altered kidney and thyroid function, ulcerative colitis, immunosuppression, decreased effectiveness of vaccines, low birth weight, reproductive issues, and cancers such as kidney, testicular and liver cancer. However, we are still uncovering the full health effects of these chemicals.

PFAS chemicals are now ubiquitous in the environment, recent research found PFAS chemicals in all rain water studied. DuPont and 3M had both done internal studies on the potential harmful effects of these chemicals, and had known for decades of their potential to cause cancers and low birth weight. Yet this research was not made public and the companies continued to make large profits off the harmful chemicals. In 2000 3M announced they will voluntarily halt production of PFOA and PFOS — technically known as "long-chain" chemicals — and will stop putting them in products by 2002. They replaced these chemicals with new "short-chain" PFAS formulations, but scientists have found these replacements to be possibly just as hazardous.

Lawsuits have been brought against companies and governments concerning the use and environmental affects of these chemicals. These chemicals have also been subject to regulatory reviews in multiple countries. Remediation of these "forever chemicals" has been attempted in hot spots around the world, by placing the contaminated soil in landfill or heating at extremely high temperature. However, these remediation methods can be expensive, prompting research into lower-cost alternatives.

Organophosphate chemicals

Organophosphate pesticides (OPs) are ester derivatives of phosphorus. These substances are found in pesticides, herbicides, and insecticides and were generally thought to be safe because they degrade quickly in the natural environment assuming there is sunlight, air, and soil. However, studies have shown these pesticides to negatively affect photosynthesis and growth in plants. These substances also get into the soil via runoff and cause decreases in soil fertility as well. Moreover, they have also been known to cause erratic swimming, respiratory stress, changes in behavior, and delayed metamorphosis in aquatic organisms.

In a specific case study, organophosphate pesticides like chlorpyrifos, diazinon, fenitrothion, and quinalphos used in agriculture in the northwestern part of Bangladesh were found to have high or acute ecological risks on the surface water and soil for aquatic insects and crustaceans. More specifically, it showed higher ecological risks for Daphnia compared to other marine organisms. The discovery of such high concentrations of pesticides could be due to the local farmers using more pesticides than the recommended amount. This could be due to agriculture being the country's biggest economical activity. With the country's rising population numbers, necessity for more food will only increase, thereby putting more pressure on farmers.

=== Cyanobacteria and cyanotoxins ===
Cyanobacteria, or blue-green algae, are photosynthetic bacteria. They grow in many types of water. Their rapid growth ("bloom") is related to high water temperature as well as eutrophication (resulting from enrichment with minerals and nutrients often due to runoff from the land that induces excessive growth of these algae). Many genera of cyanobacteria produce several toxins. Cyanotoxins can be dermatotoxic, neurotoxic, and hepatotoxic, though death related to their exposure is rare. Cyanotoxins and their non-toxic components can cause allergic reactions, but this is poorly understood. Despite their known toxicities, developing a specific biomarker of exposure has been difficult because of the complex mechanism of action these toxins possess.

==== Cyanotoxins in drinking water ====
The occurrence of this toxin in drinking water depends on a couple of factors. One, is the drinking water's level in raw source water and secondly, it depends on the effectiveness of removing these toxins from water when drinking water is actually being produced. Due to being no data on the absence/presence of these toxins in drinking water, it is very hard to actually monitor the amounts that are present in finished water, but several biosensors are being developed to tackle this problem. This is a result of the U.S not having state or federal programs in place that actually monitor the presence of this toxins in drinking water treatment plants. In July 2026, the WHO has established health‑based guideline values for key cyanotoxins, including microcystins, cylindrospermopsins, anatoxin‑a and saxitoxins, in drinking water and emphasizes their control within comprehensive water safety plans.

==== Effects on humans ====
Though data on the effects of these two toxins are limited, from what is available it suggests the toxins attack the liver and kidney. There was an hepatoenteritis-like outbreak in Palm Island, Australia (1979), due to the consumption of water that contained, "C. raciborskii, a cyanobacteria that can produce cylindrospermopsin." Most cases (typically involving children) have required they be taken to a hospital. The results of hospitilation include: Vomiting, kidney damage (due to lose of water, protein and electrolytes) fever, bloody diarrhea, and headaches.

== Societies ==
- American College of Toxicology (ACT)
- Society of Environmental Toxicology and Chemistry (SETAC)
- Society of Toxicology (SOT)

== Journals ==
- Environmental Health Perspectives
- Environmental Toxicology
- Environmental Toxicology & Pharmacology
- Journal of Environmental Science and Health
- Journal of Toxicology and Environmental Health
- Toxicological & Environmental Chemistry

== See also ==
- Ecotoxicology
- Environmental chemistry
- Environmental science
- Manganese
- Paraquat
- Toluene
- Toxicology
- Unacceptable Levels (2013 documentary film)
