= Autism Research Institute =

Non-profit organization in the USA advocating for alternative treatments for autism

- Founded: 1967; 59 years ago
- Founder: Bernard Rimland
- Tax ID no.: 95-2548452
- Legal status: 501(c)(3) nonprofit organization
- Location: San Diego, California, United States
- Board of directors: Kelly Barnhill (Chair); Robert Hendren (Vice Chair); Harland Winter (Secretary); James Walker (Treasurer); Margaret Bauman; Wenn Lawson
- Key people: Stephen Edelson (Executive Director and Chief Science Officer); Denise Fulton (Chief Operating Officer); Melanie Glock (Communications and Online Learning Specialist); Rebecca McKenney (Office Manager); Nataliya Vasylevskaya (Consultant and Outreach Coordinator); Meaghan Weldele de Oliveira (Content Consultant)
- Revenue: $1,775,271 (2023)
- Expenses: $1,428,445 (2023)
- Staff: 5 employees (2023)
- Website: autism.org
- Formerly called: Institute for Child Behavior Research

The Autism Research Institute (ARI) is an autism-focused nonprofit organization that created a controversial program, Defeat Autism Now! (DAN!), in 1995. Initially called the Institute for Child Behavior Research, ARI was founded in 1967 by Bernard Rimland "to conduct and sponsor research aimed at finding the causes and developing treatments for autism." The organization has historically promoted the false claim that vaccines cause autism, as well as discredited alternative autism treatments, such as chelation therapy.

== Autism-related pseudoscience ==
=== Defeat Autism Now! (DAN!) ===
DAN! advocated for alternative treatments for autism and maintained a registry of doctors that were trained by the program to perform them. DAN! was one of the more prominent advocates for the now discredited belief that vaccines may be a cause of autism. Its "highest rated" autism treatment was chelation therapy, which involves removing heavy metals from the body. Its chelation treatment was not supported by mainstream doctors. Doctors told the Chicago Tribune the treatments were dangerous and that misleading tests were used to show that those with autism had a high rate of heavy metals. According to the Chicago Tribune, metals occur naturally in the body and very little is known about what a normal range is. As of 2009, three-fourths of families with a child diagnosed with autism will try an alternative treatment like those that were prescribed by DAN!.

ARI's director said in 2011 that the organization's views on autism treatments had changed. The DAN! program and doctor registry was discontinued in January 2011, which was followed by the disbanding of the DAN! conference in 2012.

=== Folinic acid ===
In the early 2010s, ARI funded Richard E. Frye's research into the use of folinic acid (otherwise known as leucovorin) to treat autism. Frye has claimed that antibodies allegedly present in the majority of autistic people prevent folate from crossing the blood-brain barrier, leading to mitochondrial dysfunction, and that folinic acid can normalize the brain's folate levels. However, his research methodology (including his methods for measuring patients' folate levels) has been criticized by some mainstream researchers. Further, a study Frye was conducting in 2015 was halted by the Food and Drug Administration (FDA) due to "unreasonable and significant risk of illness or injury to human subjects." As of October 2025, the American Academy of Pediatrics does not recommend the use of folinic acid to treat autism and has called for "[l]arger, well-controlled clinical trials" to determine if folinic acid is a safe treatment that would broadly benefit the autistic population. Frye's research received renewed attention that year due to the endorsement of folinic acid as an autism treatment by anti-vaccine activist and United States Secretary of Health and Human Services Robert F. Kennedy Jr. The FDA approved folinic acid for the treatment of cerebral folate transport deficiency in March 2026 (but did not approve it to treat autism at that time, despite Kennedy's recent statements).

== Finances ==
For calendar year 2023, ARI reported approximately $1.78 million in income, $1.43 million in expenses, and $4.68 million in net assets. ARI paid out salaries, benefits and other compensation totaling $469,366. The group's executive director, Stephen M. Edelson, received compensation totaling $185,999. Four of its nine board members received compensation collectively totaling $10,930. ARI spent $170,000 on operations outside the United States.

=== Fundraising ===
Approximately $1.69 million of ARI's income for calendar year 2023 came from grants and charitable contributions.

During the fiscal year ending June 30, 2023, ARI received an $86,850 grant from the Fidelity Investments Charitable Gift Fund.

During calendar year 2023, ARI received a $50,000 grant from the For Autistic Kids Foundation, a nonprofit that supports curing and preventing autism and describes it as "robbing children of cognitive, communication and social skills."

During the fiscal year ending June 30, 2024, ARI received a $28,112 grant from the National Philanthropic Trust.

=== Grantmaking ===
ARI paid out grants totaling $504,929 during calendar year 2023. ARI awarded a $95,050 grant to the ASU Foundation and $50,000 grants to Duke University and Rutgers University.
