= Bernard Rimland =

American psychologist (1928–2006)

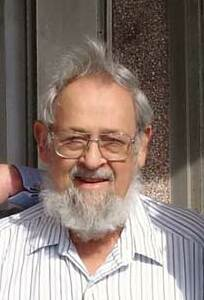
- Born: November 15, 1928; Cleveland, Ohio, U.S.
- Died: November 21, 2006 (aged 78); San Diego, California, U.S.
- Education: San Diego State University (Bachelor's); Pennsylvania State University (PhD)
- Known for: Autism research Alternative autism treatments Autism-related pseudoscience Anti-vaccine activism
- Scientific career
- Fields: Psychology
- Workplaces: Autism Research Institute; Autism Society of America

Bernard Rimland (November 15, 1928 – November 21, 2006) was an American research psychologist, alternative medicine promoter, writer, and lecturer, who was influential in dispelling the once-prevalent belief that autism was caused by emotionally cold or distant parenting. Rimland's first book, Infantile Autism—inspired by his experience parenting an autistic son—was instrumental in changing attitudes about the disorder. Rimland founded and directed two advocacy groups: the Autism Society of America (ASA) and the Autism Research Institute (ARI). He also promoted several unproven or discredited theories about the causes and treatment of autism. This included falsely claiming a link between vaccines and autism, falsely promoting facilitated communication as a legitimate form of augmentative and alternative communication, and falsely promoting chelation therapy and secretin as effective autism treatments. He also supported the ethically controversial practice of using aversives (including electric shocks) on autistic children.

== Education ==
Rimland completed his undergraduate studies and earned a master's degree in psychology at San Diego State University. He obtained his Ph.D. in experimental psychology and research design, from Pennsylvania State University in 1953.

== Career ==
Upon completion of his doctorate, Rimland and his wife moved back to San Diego. Rimland worked as a psychologist at the Point Loma Naval Station, where he remained until 1985.

After the birth of his son, Mark, and his subsequent diagnosis of autism around the age of two, Rimland began researching the disorder. The prevailing theory in the 1950s was that autism was the reaction of children to mothers who were "cold and distant". Rimland's personal experience contradicted this idea of "refrigerator mothers" and he began searching for alternative explanations.

In 1964, Rimland published his book, Infantile Autism: The Syndrome and Its Implications for a Neural Theory of Behavior. In the book, Rimland asserted that autism was not a psychological manifestation caused by unfeeling parents, a widely held belief popularized by Bruno Bettelheim. Instead, Rimland suggested, autism was a result of biochemical defects "triggered by environmental assaults". He acknowledged that there may also be a genetic component predisposing children to the disorder. Rimland argued that autism could "be treated—or at least ameliorated—with biomedical and behavioral therapies." Infantile Autism challenged the medical establishment's perceptions of autism. Rimland's message resonated with parents and, after the book was published, he began getting calls and letters from people who wanted to share their stories and ask for advice.

In 1965, Rimland founded the Autism Society of America (ASA), a parent advocacy organization, to "work on behalf of autistic children and their families at local, state and national levels."

In 1967, Rimland left the ASA to establish the Autism Research Institute (ARI), a San Diego–based non-profit organization dedicated to researching and collecting data on autism and related disorders. He kept a database of research and case histories, as well as conducted and sponsored research in an attempt identify the cause of autism and offer effective treatment solutions. He published an ARI newsletter, which reached an international audience. Rimland was also the editor of the Autism Research Review International, published by ARI, which covers biomedical and educational advances in autism research.

Rimland served as technical advisor on autism for the 1988 movie Rain Man. Rimland suggested giving Raymond Babbitt, the movie's main character portrayed by Dustin Hoffman, the extraordinary characteristics of someone with savant syndrome. Hoffman interviewed Rimland's son, Mark, in preparing for the role. He felt the movie portrayed disabled people (particularly autistic people) sympathetically. The makers of the movie made a donation of $75,000, intended to go to ARI. However, the check was made out to ASA in error. Rimland sued to get the money returned, but lost in court because he failed to file the lawsuit in time.

In 1995, Rimland established Defeat Autism Now! (DAN!), an initiative overseen by ARI that claimed to promote effective biomedical autism treatments. However, DAN! primarily focused on the promotion of unproven or discredited alternative autism treatments and prophylactics, including chelation therapy, gluten-free, casein-free diets, vitamin therapy, hyperbaric oxygen therapy, and vaccine avoidance.

Rimland eventually returned to ASA leadership, last serving as an honorary member of the organization's board of directors in 2006 (the year he died).

== Stance on key issues ==
Rimland was outspoken on what he believed to be the major causes for autism: environmental pollutants, antibiotics, and vaccinations. Sometimes, this put him at odds with the established medical community. In a letter to the editor of the Washington Post in 1997, Rimland wrote: "The reason that the public–and Congress–supports alternative medicine is that conventional medicine, despite its arrogance, is far too ineffective, far too harmful and far too costly. Non-conventional medicine is a rational alternative to a much greater evil–conventional medicine."

=== Vaccinations, thiomersal, and chelation therapy ===
Rimland considered vaccinations to be a "prime suspect" in the onset of autism. He maintained that, while not proven, there was a direct link between thiomersal (a harmless mercury-based preservative used in some vaccines) and autism. He also supported anti-vaccine activist Andrew Wakefield's now-discredited suggestion that the MMR vaccine was linked to autism. Rimland contended that the vaccination triggered autism by placing a burden on the immune systems of children between birth and age 2.

Rimland further alleged a link between the increase in autism diagnoses in the 1980s and the introduction of the MMR vaccine, a correlation the Centers for Disease Control, the American Academy of Pediatrics, and the American Medical Association did not support. He also rejected the idea that a diagnosis of autism at or around 18 months, the same time the vaccinations were administered, was coincidental. In 2001, when the California Department of Health Services, along with studies from England and Finland, reported that the vaccine "plays little or no role in the disease", Rimland stated that it was "much too early to dismiss the [vaccine] hypothesis". He also cast doubt on the findings of a 2001 study by Robert L. Davis, published in the Archives of Pediatrics and Adolescent Medicine. Davis found neither an association between the MMR vaccine and inflammatory bowel disease "nor any evidence that the vaccine triggered acute onset of symptoms." In 2004, 10 of the 13 co-authors of Wakefield's 1998 paper suggesting a potential link between the MMR vaccine and autism withdrew their original interpretation. In 2010, The Lancet formally retracted the paper outright due to ethical misconduct and fraud on Wakefield's part.

Rimland also alleged autistic traits were symptoms of heavy-metal poisoning caused by exposure to thiomersal and other forms of mercury. Based on this belief, he advocated for the use of chelation therapy—which removes heavy metals from the body—to treat autism. In 2005, he told NBC News that chelation therapy was "by far the most effective treatment available" for autism.

It is scientific consensus that there is no link between any vaccine or vaccine ingredient and autism and that the thiomersal used as a preservative in some vaccines is not harmful. Chelation therapy is unproven as an autism treatment and has sometimes resulted in kidney damage, death, or other serious complications when improperly administered.

=== Diet therapy and secretin ===
Rimland supported research that focused on "natural, non-toxic ways" to address symptoms of autism. He believed that vitamins (specifically B-6 and magnesium) and minerals could help change body chemistry and bring about behavioral changes.

Rimland advocated the use of secretin, a "naturally occurring intestinal hormone, saying it was "possibly the most important discovery in the history of autism. He claimed that children treated with the hormone showed "sudden and dramatic improvement". However, researchers in North Carolina and the University of Chicago in separate studies showed that the children receiving treatments with secretin showed "no more improvement" than those receiving a placebo. This treatment was not recommended by the National Institute of Child Health and Human Development.

=== Facilitated communication ===
Rimland was an early supporter of facilitated communication (FC) (now discredited), though he disputed founder Douglas Biklen's claims that autism was "fundamentally a motor problem". At first, Rimland claimed the technique was effective for "a small number of people", but far fewer than the 100% success rate claimed by some proponents. He advocated "properly conducted research" to determine whether correct answers could be obtained if the facilitator did not know the answers.

As FC generated false claims of abuse (about 25 by his count in 1993), mostly against parents, Rimland's view of FC's usefulness changed to one of caution. "In almost every instance of this sort, when charges have come to court and been investigated, courts have decided that they were untrue." Rimland later said, "How is it possible that an autistic kid can pick up the last tiny crumbs of potato chips off a plate but not have sufficient motor coordination to type the letter E?"

Rimland became a "vigorous critic" of FC after "more than two dozen 'blind' trials, showed the people with autism being facilitated "typed the names of objects that only the facilitators had been shown." In 1995, Rimland reported that peer-reviewed studies (40+) with more than 400 people with autism as subjects had "failed to document FC in all but a handful of cases." As a result, in 1994, the American Psychological Association, the American Academy of Child and Adolescent Psychiatry and the American Speech–Language–Hearing Association noted in their position statements that "there is no scientific proof that communication via a facilitator is valid."

=== Applied behavior analysis ===
Rimland was a proponent of applied behavior analysis (ABA), a controversial operant-conditioning system popularized as an autism treatment by psychologist Ole Ivar Lovaas. Lovaas' methods initially included the use of aversive stimuli to modify behavior, including slaps and electric shocks, as well as the withholding of food. In 1964, Rimland began treating his own son using operant conditioning after meeting with Lovaas and observing his methods.

==== Aversives ====
Rimland was in favor of using aversives (including electric shocks) to modify the behavior of autistic children and advocated against the passage of California's Hughes Act of 1990, which heavily restricted their use. At least once, he misrepresented the views of his colleagues to make it seem as though they supported aversives when they did not so as to further his viewpoint. After Rimland quoted Anne Donnellan and another anti-aversive behaviorist as being in support of the practice, Donnellan issued the following response: "We never have made or written such a statement. Dr. Rimland has been warned publicly and privately that to continue to use our names and our professional reputations to support positions that he espouses and we oppose exposes him to charges of unethical, illegal, as well as ridiculous conduct."

==== Criticism of evidence base and other proponents ====
Despite Rimland's support of ABA, he criticized those who characterized it as the only scientifically validated autism treatment, including the New York State Department of Health and the behaviorist nonprofit Association for Science in Autism Treatment (ASAT). In a 1999 column published by ARI's Autism Research Review International, Rimland claimed ABA's evidence base was weak in comparison to that of the vitamin B6 and magnesium treatments he had promoted. He also criticized Lovaas' "centerpiece" 1987 ABA study for not being double-blinded and its results not being replicated to date. In response, ASAT's board of directors claimed Rimland was misrepresenting ABA's evidence base and research methodologies and criticized him and the publication for their past promotion of unproven or discredited autism treatments and supports (including facilitated communication and the megadosing of vitamin B6 and magnesium).

== Personal life ==
Rimland was born on November 15, 1928, in Cleveland, Ohio. He and his family moved to San Diego, California, in 1940.

In 1951, Rimland married Gloria Belle Alf. They had three children. Mark, born in 1956, exhibited challenging behaviors which Rimland self-diagnosed through research as autism. This condition, relatively unknown at the time, was confirmed by a pediatrician.

== Death ==
At the age of 78, Rimland died of prostate cancer on November 21, 2006, at a care facility in El Cajon, California.

== Books ==
- 1964 Infantile Autism: The Syndrome and Its Implication for a Neural Theory of Behavior - written after his son, Mark, was diagnosed as autism.
- 1976 Modern Therapies (with Virginia Binder, A. Binder)
- 1998 Biological Treatments for Autism and PDD (with William Shaw, Lisa Lewis, Bruce Semon)
- 2001 Tired - so Tired!: And the "Yeast Connection" (with William Crook, Cynthia Crook)
- 2003 Vaccines, Autism and Childhood Disorders: Crucial Data That Could Save Your Child's Life (with Neil Z. Miller)
- 2003 Treating Autism: Parent Stories of Hope and Success (with Stephen M. Edelson, Ph.D.)
- 2006 Recovering Autistic Children (originally published as Treating Autism) Second Edition (with Stephen M. Edelson, Ph.D.)
