= Ruth C. Sullivan =

American autism activist (1924–2021)

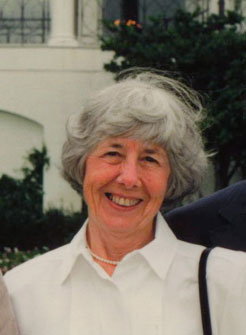
- Dr. Ruth C. Sullivan
- Born: Ruth Christ; April 20, 1924; Mowata, Louisiana, U.S.
- Died: September 16, 2021 (aged 97); Huntington, West Virginia, U.S.
- Education: Charity Hospital (New Orleans) RN; Teachers College, Columbia University B.S., M.A. Ohio University Ph.D.
- Occupations: Organizer and advocate for the education of autistic people

Ruth Christ Sullivan (April 20, 1924 – September 16, 2021) was an American organizer and advocate for the education of autistic people.

== Activism ==
In 1965, Sullivan cofounded the Autism Society of America (formerly called the National Society for Autistic Children), and was its first elected president; she was also on the permanent honorary board of the society. Sullivan was the former executive director of the Autism Services Center, a nonprofit, licensed behavioral health care agency that she founded in Huntington, West Virginia in 1979. She retired from the Autism Services Center on November 1, 2007, at the age of 83.

Sullivan was one of the lobbyists for Public Law 94-142 (the Education of All Handicapped Children Act, now known as the Individuals with Disabilities Education Act, or IDEA), which guaranteed a public education to all children in the United States. Before the passage of the law, individual school districts in most states were allowed to choose whether they were willing to educate a disabled child.

She also helped found the West Virginia Autism Training Center at Marshall University, in Huntington, West Virginia, where her husband was a university professor.

She gave presentations in multiple countries, including Australia, South Africa, Kuwait, Argentina, the Netherlands and France. She wrote articles on autism from the point of view of parents and care providers, most recently in the Handbook of Autism and Pervasive Developmental Disorders (Wiley, 2005), edited by Fred Volkmar. She wrote the foreword to The Way I See It: A Personal Look at Autism and Asperger's (2008) by Temple Grandin, an autistic adult; she was the person who first asked Grandin to speak in public about being autistic. She was one of the founders of the National Association of Residential Providers for Adults with Autism.

== Film ==
Sullivan assisted in the production of the 1988 movie Rain Man by serving as a consultant on autistic behavior, and Dustin Hoffman worked with Sullivan and her autistic son, Joseph, when practicing for the role of Raymond Babbitt. Hoffman thanked her and Joseph in his Oscar speech. Sullivan has the last credit in the movie, and the extended DVD version features an interview with Joseph. Joseph was not the only inspiration for Hoffman's role; the role was originally written after writer Barry Morrow met savant Kim Peek. Other sources for the character of Babbitt included Bill Sackter and Mark Rimland, son of Bernard Rimland.

== Personal life ==
Sullivan was trained as a registered nurse at Charity Hospital (New Orleans). She served in the United States Army Nurse Corps during World War II and afterwards became a public health nurse. She later earned a B.S. in public health nursing and, in 1952, an M.A. in public health administration from Teachers College, Columbia University. She had seven children, and was a Kentucky Colonel. She received a PhD from Ohio University in 1984.

She died in Huntington, West Virginia, on September 16, 2021, at the age of 97.
