= James B. Adams (professor) =

American academic

James Brewster Adams
- Education: Duke University (B.A.); University of Wisconsin-Madison (M.S., PhD)
- Known for: Autism-related research Autism-related pseudoscience Anti-vaccine activism
- Spouse: Marie Adams
- Children: Three
- Scientific career
- Fields: Engineering; Neuroscience
- Institutions: Arizona State University
- Thesis: Nucleation and growth of thin films (1987)

James B. Adams is a President's Professor at Arizona State University, where he directs the autism/Asperger's research program, though he originally taught chemical and materials engineering there. Adams also holds a post at the Southwest College of Naturopathic Medicine and is the president of the Autism Society of Greater Phoenix and the co-chair of the Autism Research Institute's scientific advisory committee. He was featured on Dateline NBC in 2006 in a story about his controversial use of chelation therapy to treat autistic children. Adams has promoted various discredited or unproven alternative treatments for autism (including chelation therapy) and has made the false claim that vaccines may cause autism in "rare cases," including that of his own daughter.

== Education ==
Adams has a bachelor's degree from Duke University in physics (1984), as well an MS (1986) and a PhD (1987) in materials engineering from the University of Wisconsin-Madison.

== Career ==
Adams was formerly an assistant, and later associate, professor of engineering at the University of Illinois at Urbana-Champaign from 1989 to 1996, whereupon he became an associate professor at ASU. He became a full professor in 1998.

== Research ==
=== Engineering ===
Adams' team at ASU works in the field of computational and materials science, studying semiconductor processing and the ideal coatings for tools used for aluminum processing using computer simulations, as well as silicon thin-film cells. In 2012, he was elected a Fellow of ASM International – The Materials Information Society.

=== Autism ===
Adams has hypothesized that heavy metals, particularly cadmium and mercury, may play a role in the pathogenesis of autism, and has advocated treatment with chelation therapy (a discredited and dangerous treatment in the context of autism) and pioglitazone. Adams further contends that elevated testosterone levels are linked to the depletion of glutathione, which in turn results in increased susceptibility to toxic metals, citing a study published by Simon Baron-Cohen, which contains "major logical and factual flaws" according to some autism experts. Adams was on the scientific advisory board of the International Academy of Oral Medicine and Toxicology, a group that publicizes the purported dangers of dental amalgam despite some evidence to the contrary. Adams also claims that autistic children have an increased need for certain vitamins and minerals. As of 2025, Adams sits on the scientific advisory board of the Autism Research Institute, an organization that has historically promoted many of the same unproven or discredited autism theories and treatments as Adams himself.

In 2019, Adams and a group of other researchers published a study in which they tested microbiota transfer therapy on autistic children.

== Controversial opinions ==
In a 2006 NBC News interview, Adams noted that acrodynia, a condition that afflicted children roughly a hundred years ago, was found to be caused by mercury-containing teething powders, and that "symptoms of acrodynia were pretty similar to symptoms of autism". However, multiple sources, including a paper published in the medical journal Pediatrics, have noted major differences between the symptoms of mercury poisoning and those of autism.

In 2016, Adams came under fire for posting an advertisement for the widely criticized anti-vaccine film Vaxxed on one of ASU's official Facebook pages. Adams subsequently edited the post to include a disclaimer that the movie "represents only one side of the MMR-vaccine controversy", and admitted that he had not actually seen it. He later deleted the post altogether at ASU's request, but continued to promote the film in his capacity as president of the Autism Society of Greater Phoenix. While declining to describe himself as "anti-vaccine", Adams told a reporter that he does believe vaccines, in "rare cases", may cause autism—despite a 20-year accumulation of scientific evidence to the contrary.

== Personal life ==
Adams and his wife, Marie, have three children. He became interested in autism when his daughter, Kim, was diagnosed with the disorder in 1994; he has stated he suspects this occurred because of her vaccinations and stopped vaccinating her after her autism diagnosis.

== Selected publications ==
=== Engineering ===
- Yang SH, Drabold DA, Adams JB, Ordejón P, Glassford K (1997). "Density functional studies of small platinum clusters". Journal of Physics: Condensed Matter. 9 (5): L39–L45. doi:10.1088/0953-8984/9/5/002. S2CID 250921288.
- Siegel D, Hector L, Adams J (2002). "Adhesion, atomic structure, and bonding at the Al(111)/α-Al2O3(0001) interface: A first principles study". Physical Review B. 65 (8) 085415. Bibcode:2002PhRvB..65h5415S. doi:10.1103/PhysRevB.65.085415.

=== Autism ===
- Adams JB, Romdalvik J, Ramanujam VM, Legator MS (June 2007). "Mercury, lead, and zinc in baby teeth of children with autism versus controls". Journal of Toxicology and Environmental Health. Part A. 70 (12): 1046–51. Bibcode:2007JTEHA..70.1046A. doi:10.1080/15287390601172080. PMID 17497416. S2CID 7867468.
- Geier DA, Kern JK, Garver CR, Adams JB, Audhya T, Nataf R, Geier MR (May 2009). "Biomarkers of environmental toxicity and susceptibility in autism". Journal of the Neurological Sciences. 280 (1–2): 101–8. doi:10.1016/j.jns.2008.08.021. PMID 18817931. S2CID 13266081.
- Adams JB, Johansen LJ, Powell LD, Quig D, Rubin RA (March 2011). "Gastrointestinal flora and gastrointestinal status in children with autism--comparisons to typical children and correlation with autism severity". BMC Gastroenterology. 11 22. doi:10.1186/1471-230X-11-22. PMC 3072352. PMID 21410934.
- Kang DW, Park JG, Ilhan ZE, Wallstrom G, Labaer J, Adams JB, Krajmalnik-Brown R (2013). Gilbert JA (ed.). "Reduced incidence of Prevotella and other fermenters in intestinal microflora of autistic children". PLOS ONE. 8 (7) e68322. Bibcode:2013PLoSO...868322K. doi:10.1371/journal.pone.0068322. PMC 3700858. PMID 23844187.
