= Autism Services Center =

Healthcare provider in West Virginia, United States

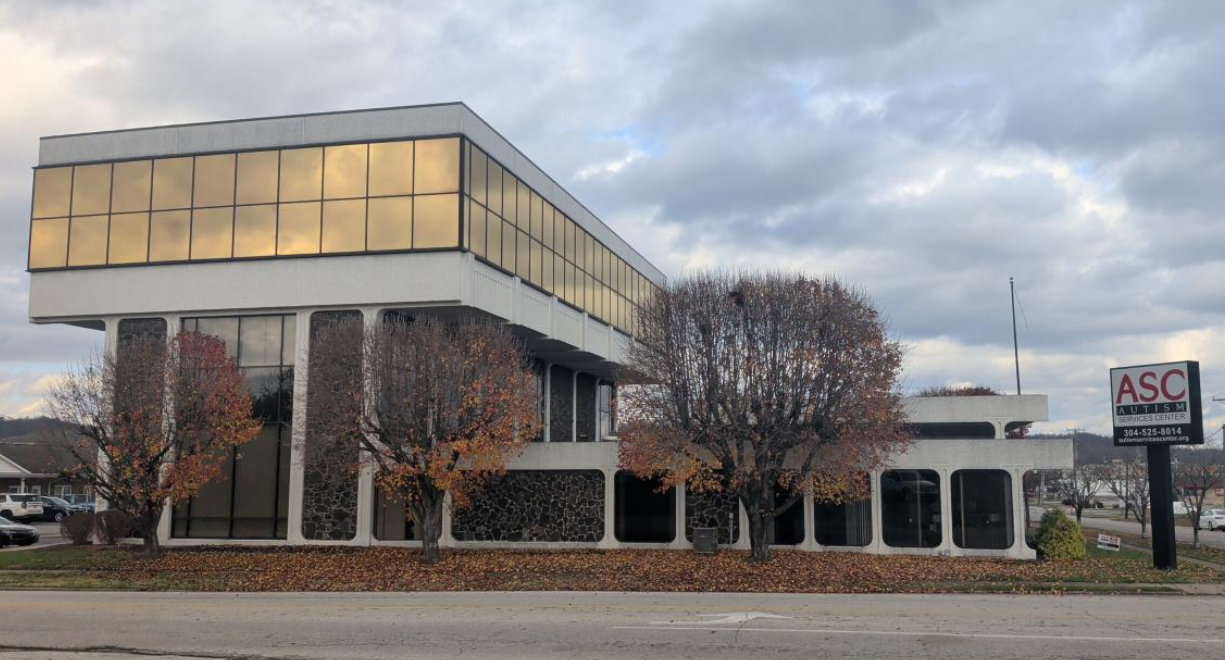
- The Autism Services Center in 2025.
- Founded: 1979; 47 years ago
- Founder: Ruth C. Sullivan
- Type: Community mental health service
- Tax ID no.: 55-0603326
- Location: 10 6th Ave W, Huntington, West Virginia, United States
- Coordinates: 38.415696°N 82.4571654°W
- Services: Behavioral health; Autism services; Group homes
- Revenue: $14.3 million (2024)
- Expenses: $16.1 million (2024)
- Employees: 609 (2023)
- Website: autismservicescenter.org

Autism Services Center (ASC) is a behavioral health center in Huntington, West Virginia that focuses on autism services.

== History ==
Ruth C. Sullivan founded ASC in 1979 after serving as the co-founder and first president of the Autism Society of America. The organization was initially founded as a local referral service, and in 1981 provided telephone-based technical assistance and case management to caregivers and professionals. Sullivan sought to provide an alternative to state-run institutional care for autistic people, and the center opened the first group homes for autistic people in the state. In 1983, the organization took on their first client, a 12-year-old girl, who the state institutions found unmanageable. By 2009, the organization had grown to have 400 employees treating 260 clients and is one of the largest employers in Huntington.

Dustin Hoffman's character in Rain Man, Raymond Babbitt, was heavily influenced by Joseph Sullivan, a patient of ASC and the son of Ruth C. Sullivan. In 1988, the premiere of Rain Man was held in Huntington, with some proceeds going to ASC; the organization used the funds to buy a group home.

In 2025, ASC opened an applied behavior analysis therapy center in St. Albans, West Virginia.

== Services ==
For patients, the center provides physical therapy, speech therapy, and applied behavior analysis, in addition to supported employment and a limited residential program for adults who are unable to live independently.

The center provides training and education for caregivers and professionals, and sometimes receives visitors from across the United States. In 2016, two Argentinian caregivers of autistic children spent a week in Huntington to learn about its residential program in the hopes of replicating it in Argentina.
