= Journal of Toxicology and Environmental Health =

- Discipline: Environmental toxicology
- Language: English
- Edited by: Sam Kacew

Publication details
- History: 1975-present
- Publisher: Taylor & Francis
- Frequency: Part A: biweekly, Part B: 8/year
- Impact factor: 1.733 (Part A); 3.896 (Part B) (2012)

Standard abbreviations
- ISO 4: J. Toxicol. Environ. Health

Indexing
- Journal of Toxicology and Environmental Health
- CODEN: JTEHD6
- ISSN: 0098-4108
- LCCN: 75649460
- OCLC no.: 637668532
- Part A
- ISSN: 1528-7394 (print); 1087-2620 (web)
- Part B
- ISSN: 1093-7404 (print); 1521-6950 (web)

Links
- Part A; Part B; Part A online archive; Part B online archive; Online archive (1975-1997)

The Journal of Toxicology and Environmental Health is a peer-reviewed public health journal covering environmental toxicology. It was established in 1975 and in 1998 was split into Part A: Current Issues and Part B: Critical Reviews. According to the Journal Citation Reports, Part A has a 2012 impact factor of 1.733, whereas Part B has a 2012 impact factor of 3.896.
