= Dan Rossignol =

American family medicine doctor

Daniel A. Rossignol is an American family medicine doctor. Rossignol runs the Rossignol Medical Center, with offices in Melbourne, Florida and in Aliso Viejo, California. He also works at the Wisconsin Integrative Hyperbaric Center in Fitchburg, Wisconsin, and is a member of the physician advisory board for The Autism Community in Action (TACA; formerly Talk About Curing Autism). Rossignol is known for his promotion of various discredited or unproven autism therapies.

== Education ==
Rossignol received his MD from the Virginia Commonwealth University School of Medicine and completed his residency in family medicine at the University of Virginia.

== Research ==
Rossignol's website states that he has published 47 scientific papers, whereas Google Scholar lists 37. Also according to Google Scholar, Rossignol has an h-index of 12. He is best known for publishing randomized clinical trials of hyperbaric oxygen therapy (HBOT) for children with autism, having originally proposed their use for the condition in a 2006 non-peer reviewed paper in Medical Hypotheses. These trials have usually concluded that it is safe, and that it may be effective, but that further study is needed before it can be said to have been proven effective. With regard to one of these studies, published in 2009, Rossignol said, "We wanted to do a formal study that looked to see if this was even a valid treatment," and "We hoped to stimulate more research." He has received the Edgar End Memorial Award from the Undersea and Hyperbaric Medical Society for his HBOT-related research. Some of Rossignol's other research has focused on the prevalence of mitochondrial disease in autistic children, and has concluded that mitochondrial disorders are more common among autistic children than neurotypical children. With regard to this study, Cecilia Giulivi of the University of California, Davis agreed that it appeared from Rossignol's paper that there is indeed a higher incidence of mitochondrial disease among autistic individuals. In addition, Rossignol and Richard E. Frye teamed up to conduct a meta-analysis on the efficacy of melatonin supplements as a treatment for autism. They published their findings in 2011, and while they concluded that it is associated with "improved sleep parameters, better daytime behavior, and minimal side effects," they also called for more research to confirm their findings. A follow-up paper by the same two authors, published on September 20, 2013, as an Epub ahead of print, came to similar conclusions.

=== Criticism ===
Rossignol's best-known paper is a clinical trial of HBOT published in 2009, which received widespread media attention. Critics of this research include Steven Novella, who has noted that Rossignol provides HBOT in his clinical practice and therefore "stands to gain personally if its effectiveness is proven." Its methodology was also subject to some criticism, for example by Paul Offit, who argued that "it was possible that at least some parents could tell whether the treatment was active or not, leading to possible observer bias that was not controlled in the study," in contrast to Rossignol et al.'s claim that the parents in the study did not know whether their child had received real HBOT as opposed to the sham version. In addition, John Gever and Steven Novella noted that this study only measured autistic symptoms for four weeks. Additionally, the Committee for the Advancement of Scientific Skepticism wrote that Rossignol's 2009 study "...measured a baseline level of ASD based on three indices [one of which has been discredited] and then measured the degree of improvement within the two groups. There were no comparisons between the placebo and treatment groups, which is essential to determine if there was any benefit for treatment with HBOT. As a result, no firm conclusions about the usefulness of HBOT in the treatment of ASD can be made based on the results of this study." Similarly, Aetna released a policy brief on HBOT in which they stated that, in this study, "There were no significant differences between treatment and control groups in total score, and in the subscales for speech, sociability, and health," and Richard Mills noted that because "children with autism often struggle with other medical issues," "it is difficult to discern exactly which condition hyperbaric therapy might benefit." In response to this criticism, Rossignol has said that "kids who receive the same number of sessions outside of research settings often remain better for longer [than the four week period during which their symptoms were monitored in the study]," and that "You wouldn't anticipate a physician who wasn't doing hyperbaric-oxygen therapy to actually conduct a study of it. Oftentimes when things are new — and this is kind of a new finding — the people who do the studies are going to be those who are involved in it to begin with."

== Lawsuit ==
In 2010, Rossignol was sued in Cook County Circuit Court by James Coman, who alleged that Rossignol, along with another family practice physician, Anjum Usman of Naperville, had administered "dangerous and unnecessary experimental treatments", including chelation therapy, to Coman's son, who was 7 years old at the time. Chelation therapy has never been proven to be an effective autism treatment and has sometimes resulted in death or other serious complications when improperly administered to autistic children.

== Personal life ==
Rossignol is married to Lanier Watkins Rossignol (formerly known as Elizabeth Lanier Watkins). They have two sons, Isaiah and Joshua, both of whom have autism. Lanier has been licensed as a registered nurse since 1996 and resides in Aliso Viejo, California. Rossignol has said he was first introduced to HBOT when his wife suggested using it on their sons, which he then proceeded to do.
