= Richard E. Frye =

American autism researcher

Richard Eugene Frye
- Education: Long Island University C. W. Post Campus, Drexel University
- Known for: Autism-related pseudoscience Anti-vaccine activism
- Scientific career
- Fields: Child psychiatry
- Workplaces: University of Arkansas for Medical Sciences, University of Texas Health Science Center at Houston
- Thesis: An exploration of methods for evaluating the usefulness of new and existing aerodynamic equations in detecting nasal airway disease (1992)

Richard Eugene Frye is an American medical researcher best known for promoting fringe theories about the causes and treatments of autism (including the debunked claim that autism and vaccines are linked). He was formerly an associate professor at Arizona Children's Hospital in Phoenix, and before that at the University of Arkansas for Medical Sciences's department of pediatrics, as well as the Director of the Autism Multispecialty Clinic at Arkansas Children's Hospital. Prior to that Frye was a faculty member at the University of Texas Health Science Center at Houston's division of child and adolescent neurology.

== Education ==
Frye received his bachelor's degree from Long Island University C. W. Post Campus in 1986 in psychobiology. Five years later, he obtained his M.S. from Drexel University in biomedical science/biostatistics. Frye went on to obtain his PhD and MD degrees both in 1998, and both from Georgetown University. From 1998 to 2000 Frye completed a residency in pediatrics at Jackson Memorial Hospital, before traveling to Children's Hospital Boston (CHB) to complete another residency, this time in pediatric neurology. After completing his residencies, he completed a research fellowship in behavioral neurology and learning disabilities, also at CHB, from 2003 to 2005. From 2004 to 2005 Frye completed another research fellowship, this time at Boston University in psychology.

== Medical research ==
One of Frye's highly cited papers was published in 1990, which studied the effects of cigarette smoking on the sense of smell. In fact, much of Frye's early research focused on olfaction.

=== Pseudoscientific autism research ===
Frye does not accept the scientific consensus that autism is primarily influenced by genetics and has falsely suggested that a minority of cases are caused by vaccine injuries related to mitochondrial dysfunction. Frye has also falsely questioned the safety of aluminum adjuvants used in some vaccines. Frye and his colleagues authored a 2006 case report about developmentally disabled child Hannah Poling and claimed that she was vaccine-injured, but failed to disclose that her family was seeking compensation on her behalf from the National Vaccine Injury Compensation Program. (Poling's father was also a co-author of the paper.) Frye has formally diagnosed several patients whose families sought similar compensation.

Frye has also promoted a variety of alternative autism treatments, including hyperbaric oxygen therapy and leucovorin (also known as folinic acid). Frye believes that antibodies allegedly present in autistic people prevent folate from crossing the blood-brain barrier and can be counteracted through the administration of leucovorin. Frye conducted a leucovorin clinical trial that was halted by the Food and Drug Administration in 2015 due to "unreasonable and significant risk of illness or injury to human subjects." Frye conducted a subsequent study he described in a 2018 paper, which claimed that leucovorin improved the verbal skills of autistic children when compared to placebo. The methodology of the study was deemed flawed by some of Frye's peers. A later clinical trial was disrupted by disputes with Frye's colleagues and his termination by Phoenix Children's Hospital (which controlled the grant funding the study). In September 2025, Administrator of the Centers for Medicare and Medicaid Services Mehmet Oz invited Frye to the White House to help United States Secretary of Health and Human Services Robert F. Kennedy Jr. promote leucovorin as an autism treatment, but Frye was overseas and unable to accept.

According to Frye, he has been described as a "quack" by some of his colleagues. British psychologist Dorothy V. M. Bishop of the University of Oxford stated in a 2025 interview, "He [Frye] seems to cover a remarkably wide range of things that cause autism or cure autism. ... The evidence never looks very strong to me."

Frye's more recent research focuses on the potential environmental causes of autism, as well as physiological abnormalities that have been observed in autistic individuals. Specifically, he and his co-authors, who include Dan Rossignol, have concluded that it is possible that autistic individuals suffer from immune dysregulation and oxidative stress, as well as that mitochondrial dysfunction is more common in such individuals than in the general population. In addition, Frye's research has concluded that autism may be caused by exposure to toxicants. Frye has also published research on the use of dietary supplements as autism treatments, including melatonin and tetrahydrobiopterin, and recently coauthored a review regarding treatments for children with both autism and seizures, which concluded that "limited evidence is available on the effectiveness of treatments for seizures in children with autism." However, Frye also said that this paper "...demonstrates that certain treatments could be beneficial for treating both autism symptoms and seizures at the same time." Another of Frye's studies concluded that many autistic children have abnormal levels of gut bacteria, and that these children exhibit abnormal energy metabolism as a result. Some have speculated that the results of this research "could create blood tests for early screening of the condition [i.e. autism]." In 2016, Frye contributed the foreword to a medical memoir of autistic siblings with abnormal gut bacteria and related biomarkers.

== Selected publications ==
- Poling, J. S.; Frye, R. E.; Shoffner, J.; Zimmerman, A. W. (2006). "Developmental Regression and Mitochondrial Dysfunction in a Child with Autism". Journal of Child Neurology. 21 (2): 170–172. doi:10.1177/08830738060210021401. PMC 2536523. PMID 16566887.
- Frye, R. E.; Rossignol, D. A. (2011). "Mitochondrial Dysfunction Can Connect the Diverse Medical Symptoms Associated with Autism Spectrum Disorders". Pediatric Research. 69 (5 Part 2): 41R–7R. doi:10.1203/PDR.0b013e318212f16b. PMC 3179978. PMID 21289536.
- Frye, R. E.; Sequeira, J. M.; Quadros, E. V.; James, S. J.; Rossignol, D. A. (2012). "Cerebral folate receptor autoantibodies in autism spectrum disorder". Molecular Psychiatry. 18 (3): 369–381. doi:10.1038/mp.2011.175. PMC 3578948. PMID 22230883.
