= National Philanthropic Trust =

Nonprofit organization in Jenkintown, United States

- Founded: Tax-exempt since July 1996; 30 years ago
- Type: 501(c)(3)
- Headquarters: Conshohocken, Pennsylvania
- Services: donor-advised fund
- Net Assets: 41,882,463,155 USD (2024)
- Revenue: 15,875,636,840 USD (2024)
- Expenses: 5,698,880,841 USD (2024)
- Website: www.nptrust.org

National Philanthropic Trust (NPT) is an American independent public charity that provides philanthropic expertise to donors, foundations, and financial institutions. NPT is among the largest donor-advised fund sponsors in the United States.

== Organizational overview ==
NPT was established in 1996 by the Pitcairn Trust Company in Jenkintown, Pennsylvania, as a donor-advised fund organization allowing donors to recommend charitable distributions from funds held by the trust.

Contributions from donors broke the $1 billion mark in 2005. In 2011, NPT began accepting contributions of illiquid assets like closely held stock, hedge fund interest, and real estate. NPT launched their first global affiliate in 2013.

Since its founding in 1996, NPT has raised nearly $93 billion in charitable contributions. It currently manages $65 billion in charitable assets. NPT has made more than one million grants totaling nearly $45 billion to charities all over the world.

In Fiscal Year 2025, NPT's donors recommended more than 161,000 grants in 68 countries across the globe totaling $6.61 billion (up 20% from 2024).

== International grantmaking ==
NPT also works with donors who wish to make grants to charities based outside the US. NPT Transatlantic is an international affiliate of NPT based in the UK. It is an independent UK registered charity.

== Donor-advised fund report ==
For almost 20 years, NPT published the Donor-Advised Fund Report (DAF Report), an annual industry report on donor-advised funds in the United States. NPT tracked data on donor-advised funds, including the number of individual donor-advised funds in the U.S., total dollars granted from them, total contributions to them, and total charitable assets in them.

Beginning in 2025, the Donor Advised Fund Research Collaborative (DAFRC) became the publisher of the annual DAF Report, incorporating historical data previously published by NPT. DAFRC is a research collaborative co-founded by Daniel Heist of Brigham Young University and Danielle Vance-McMullen of DePaul University that conducts empirical research on donor-advised funds.

== Senior management ==
Holly Welch Stubbing is the president and CEO of National Philanthropic Trust. Welch Stubbing holds degrees from Georgetown University’s McDonough School of Business, the University of Dayton School of Law, and Wake Forest University.

In 2026, Natalie Pinon was appointed interim CEO of National Philanthropic Trust UK, replacing outgoing CEO John Canady. She had previously served as the organization’s executive director of development. Before joining NPT UK, Pinon worked at Social and Sustainable Capital, where she was Director of Impact.
