= Martha Herbert =

American physician

Martha Reed Herbert
- Education: University of California, Santa Cruz, PhD Columbia University, MD
- Known for: Autism research Autism-related pseudoscience Anti-vaccine activism
- Scientific career
- Fields: Child psychiatry
- Workplaces: Harvard Medical School, Massachusetts General Hospital
- Thesis: Evolution as a learning process in Marx, Piaget and Habermas (1981)

Martha Herbert is an American physician and assistant professor of neurology at Harvard Medical School and pediatric neurologist at Massachusetts General Hospital. Herbert is also director of the TRANSCEND program at the Athinoula A. Martinos Center for Biomedical Imaging.

== Education ==
Herbert graduated, and received her medical degree, from the Columbia University College of Physicians and Surgeons after obtaining a doctoral degree at the University of California, Santa Cruz. She trained in evolutionary biology and the development of learning processes, and performed postdoctoral work in the philosophy and history of science.

== Career ==
Herbert began seeing patients in a psychiatry clinic in 1996; these patients presented with a variety of psychological disabilities, including headaches, seizures, behavioral-control problems, obsessions, and tics. However, as time went on she began seeing a higher proportion of autistic children. Around the same time, she was conducting a number of neuroimaging studies on differences in the brains of autistic children, and as a result of this research, she concluded that autism is a disorder that affects the entire body, not just the brain.

== Autism research and pseudoscientific claims ==
Herbert has claimed that many autistic children have biomedical problems, and that these problems make autistic traits more pronounced. Her research focuses on attributing the development of autism to the existence of certain predisposing genes, with her coauthors on this topic including Peter Szatmari. In addition, some of her research focuses on the possible existence of enlarged superficial white matter in the brains of people with autism, as well as developmental language disorder.

=== Views on environmental autism causes ===
Herbert does not believe autism is solely caused by genetic inheritance and has suggested that anyone who discounts environmental factors is unwilling to face a harsh reality that involves the complicity of researchers, corporations and authority figures. In 2004, Herbert gave the following statement to Mother Jones:

To cling to a purely genetic explanation for autism is a desperate attempt to maintain the illusion that one lives in a comfortable and rational world where new chemicals and technologies always mean progress; experts are always objective and thorough; corporations are honest; and authorities can be trusted. ... That human actions, rather than genes, might be responsible for compromising the health of a significant proportion of a whole generation is so painful as to be, for many, unthinkable.

Herbert wrote an opinion paper in 2010 that argued, among other things, "Systemic and central nervous system pathophysiology, including oxidative stress, neuroinflammation, and mitochondrial dysfunction can be consistent with a role for environmental influence."

In 2013, Herbert co-authored a case report published by the Journal of Child Neurology, which described an autistic patient who improved markedly after she was placed on a gluten-free, casein-free diet. Meta-analyses by other researchers published in 2010, 2013, 2014, 2015 and 2020 found insufficient or inconsistent evidence regarding the efficacy of gluten-free or casein-free diets as an autism treatment, with some recommending that such diets only be prescribed to patients with specific conditions proven to benefit from them (such as food allergies or intolerances). In 2022, the United Kingdom's National Health Service included exclusion diets—including gluten-free and casein-free diets—on a list of alternative autism treatments it found showed no benefit and did not recommend to the public.

==== Thimerosal and vaccines ====
Herbert wrote the introduction for anti-vaccine activist Robert F. Kennedy Jr.'s 2014 book, Thimerosal: Let the Science Speak, in which Kennedy made the false claim that the vaccine preservative thimerosal caused autism. In the introduction, Herbert labeled the book "aggressively pro-vaccine" and posited that one could be in favor of vaccination while still advocating for the removal of thimerosal from vaccines.

Herbert claimed that Kennedy's book presented "voluminous evidence" that thimerosal was toxic and stated, "To say otherwise is to pick a fight with the periodic table and the fundamental principles of physical chemistry." She also claimed that any argument that there was "no definitive proof" that vaccines or thimerosal caused autism was irrelevant given thimerosal's alleged toxicity.

It is scientific consensus that there is no link between any vaccine or vaccine ingredient and autism and that the thimerosal used as a preservative in some vaccines is not harmful.

=== The Autism Revolution ===
Herbert is also the author of a book, The Autism Revolution: Whole-Body Strategies for Making Life All It Can Be, published in 2012 by Ballantine Books. In the book, she recounts stories of autistic children who followed recommendations to receive unconventional autism treatments, and whose conditions improved, "sometimes dramatically so", according to Herbert. It was reviewed in The Washington Post, the Journal of Hospital Librarianship, and Kirkus Reviews.

The Washington Post reviewer Maggie Fazeli Fard stated, "It is unclear, however, what makes this book 'revolutionary.' Her [Herbert's] holistic approach isn’t unheard of in medicine and Herbert herself acknowledges that her strategies aren’t a cure; there’s no guarantee that any of her recommendations will work and what helps one person won’t necessarily help another."
