= Intervention in School and Clinic =

- Discipline: Education
- Language: English
- Edited by: Randall Boone, Kyle Higgins

Publication details
- Former names: Academic Therapy Quarterly, Academic Therapy
- History: 1965-present
- Publisher: SAGE Publications (United States)
- Frequency: 5/year
- Impact factor: 0.578 (2017)

Standard abbreviations
- ISO 4: Interv. Sch. Clin.

Indexing
- ISSN: 1053-4512 (print); 1538-4810 (web)
- LCCN: 90642714
- OCLC no.: 818922189

Links
- Journal homepage; Online access; Online archive

Intervention in School and Clinic is a peer-reviewed academic journal that publishes papers in the field of education. The journal's editors are Randall Boone (University of Nevada, Las Vegas) and Kyle Higgins (University of Nevada, Las Vegas). It has been in publication since 1965 and is currently published by SAGE Publications in association with the Hammill Institute on Disabilities.

== Scope ==
Intervention in School and Clinic publishes articles which focus on social, behavioral, assessment, and vocational strategies and techniques that have a direct application to classroom settings. The journal aims to equip teachers with tips, techniques, methods and ideas for improving assessment, instruction and management for individuals with learning disabilities or behavior disorders.

== Abstracting and indexing ==
Intervention in School and Clinic is abstracted and indexed in, among other databases, SCOPUS and the Social Sciences Citation Index. According to the Journal Citation Reports, its 2017 impact factor is 0.578, ranking it 38 out of 40 journals in the category ‘Education, Special’.
