= Alfred Tomatis =

Otolaryngologist and inventor

- Born: 1 January 1920; France
- Died: 25 December 2001 (aged 81)
- Occupations: Otolaryngologist and inventor
- Website: www.tomatis.com

Alfred Tomatis (1 January 1920 – 25 December 2001) was a French otolaryngologist and inventor. He received his Doctorate in Medicine from the Paris School of Medicine. His alternative medicine theories of hearing and listening are known as the Tomatis method or Audio-Psycho-Phonology (APP).

Tomatis' approach, a type of auditory integration training, is known as the Tomatis Method. It is promoted as being of benefit to people with autism, but there is no good evidence to support these claims and the Method has been classified as a pseudoscience.

== Tomatis' life and work ==
Alfred Tomatis grew up in a musical family in Nice, France. His father was an opera singer, and he spent much of his childhood traveling with him and watching his opera performances from the wings. At an early age, however, he and his parents decided he was not fit for the stage. He was sent away at age 11 to a boarding school in Paris. Shortly before WWII he began studying medicine and eventually became an Ear, Nose and Throat physician.

Soon after he began his practice, his father began referring him opera colleagues with vocal problems. Tomatis soon discovered traditional treatments inadequate but also that there was very little research on the voice itself. He formulated the theory that many vocal problems were really hearing problems. His theory that "the voice does not produce what the ear does not hear", is the hallmark of his research and his method. He discovered that the voices of opera singers had damaged their own muscles of the middle ears. With damaged hearing, they were forcing their voices to produce sounds in registers they could no longer hear.

In his attempt to retrain his patients, he developed the Electronic Ear, a device which utilizes electronic gating, bone conduction transducers and sound filters to enhance the uppermost missing frequencies. The goal is to tonify the muscles of the middle ear in order to sensitize the listener to the missing frequencies.

Tomatis began treating a number of other problems with the same methods, including reading problems, dyslexia, depression, severe schizophrenia, and even autism. He found evidence that many of these problems result from a failure of communication, which has to do with listening and the ear.

Scientific reports showed that the ear starts forming a few days after conception and that the ear is fully developed by the fourth month of pregnancy. Tomatis theorized that information coming from the fetal ear stimulates and guides the development of the brain. He believed that a number of auditory communication problems begin in pregnancy, with the fetus not properly responding to the voice of the mother. Tomatis theorized that the whole body is involved in the production of speech and language. He stated that reading, even silent reading, is an activity of the ear. He recommended reading out loud, not only for children and by children, but also by adults, for 30 minutes a day. He claimed this not only stimulates the brain but is the best way to learn.

His most controversial method attempts to lead autistic children to recognize and respond to their mother's voice. The electronic ear, he maintained, could simulate the sound of the mother's voice as heard in the uterus, and to lead the child gradually to accept and respond to her real unfiltered voice. He reported that this method often brought startling results, with children crying with joy as they recognized their mother's voice for the first time.

In many of the differing issues he addressed, Tomatis believed that many problems of learning disabilities, dyslexia, schizophrenia, and depression were caused by some trauma resulting from broken relationships and poor communication. He found that treatment of these maladies requires the cooperation of the parents and even grandparents.

In his autobiography, Tomatis recounts the many run-ins he had with the medical establishment in both France and Canada, where he later worked. Eventually he left the orthodox medical community, admitting that his practice was beyond the scope of normative allopathic comprehension. He named his new field audio-psycho-phonology.

== Tomatis Method ==
The Tomatis Method is a type of auditory integration training. It has been classified as a pseudoscience.

Due to the lack of scientific basis and the wide range of diseases it claimed to treat, French authorities have always considered Tomatis sound therapy as an alternative medicine which should not be promoted.

In general there is no good evidence that auditory integration training, such as that offered in Tomatis therapy, is of any benefit to people with autism.

Tomatis reported in his autobiography that he regretted not providing scientific colleagues with more statistical evidence for his work along with his many publications, but he said that the benefits of his methods are difficult to measure.

== The Tomatis effect ==
Tomatis adapted his techniques to target diverse disorders including auditory processing problems, dyslexia, learning disabilities, attention deficit disorders, autism, and sensory processing and motor-skill difficulties. It is also claimed to have helped adults fight depression, learn foreign languages faster, develop better communication skills, and improve both creativity and on-the-job performance. About some musicians, singers and actors it is also claimed they have said they had found it helpful for fine-tuning their tonal and harmonic skills.

The Tomatis Method uses recordings by Mozart and Gregorian Chant as well as of the patient's mother's voice. Tomatis' use of Mozart is not to be confused with so-called Mozart Effect popularized by American author and music researcher Don Campbell. Although Tomatis coined the phrase, his method is not directly related to claims that listening to Mozart increases intelligence.

Tomatis wrote fourteen books and over two thousand articles. His Ear and Language, The Conscious Ear, The Ear and the Voice and We are all Multilingual have been translated into English, the latter by author David Charles Manners.

== Awards and honors ==
Tomatis' awards and honors include:

- Knights of Public Health (1951)
- Gold Medal for Scientific Research Brussels (1958)
- Grand Medal of Vermeil from the City of Paris (1962)
- Price Isaure Clemence (1967)
- Gold Medal of the Society "Arts, Sciences and Letters" (1968)
- Commander's Cultural and Artistic Merit (1970)
- Medal of Honor Society for Promoting Arts and Letters (1992).
- Honorary Member of the Dorstmundt-Institut in Munich
- Honorary Member of the University of Potchefstroom, in South Africa, Faculty of Psychology
