= Chelation therapy for autism =

Discredited alternative autism treatment

EDTA molecule, a chemical chelator responsible for the death of an autistic child from hypocalcemia.

Chelation therapy for autism is a controversial and potentially harmful intervention based on the unproven hypothesis that autism is caused by heavy metal poisoning, particularly from mercury or lead. It is sometimes promoted as a treatment to improve behavior or cure autism, despite the lack of scientific evidence supporting its effectiveness.

Chelation therapy was widely promoted in the United States before 2010 by proponents of the Defeat Autism Now! movement, particularly among holistic practitioners. In 2005, the death of an autistic child undergoing this treatment led the National Institute of Mental Health (NIMH) to suspend a clinical trial for ethical reasons. A 2013 literature review found no evidence supporting the efficacy of chelation for autistic individuals. In France, warnings regarding the use of this treatment began to be issued in 2011.

Chelation therapy is associated with multiple adverse effects, including liver dysfunction, kidney damage, and hypocalcemia. Due to its unfavorable risk–benefit ratio, several health authorities and organizations, including the Cochrane Collaboration, the Haute Autorité de santé (HAS), and the Agence nationale de sécurité du médicament et des produits de santé (ANSM), have issued recommendations against its use in the treatment of autism.

== Context ==
Chelation therapy is typically prescribed by physicians only in cases of confirmed heavy metal poisoning. However, it has been promoted outside medical guidelines as a treatment for conditions such as autism, Alzheimer's disease, and coronary heart disease. This use is not supported by scientific evidence and has been associated with individuals lacking proper medical credentials. (Note: Sinha, Silove & Williams 2006, p. 756)

The emergence of chelation as a purported autism treatment occurred in the context of a lack of recognized curative therapies for the condition. Heavy metal poisoning, such as from mercury or lead, is not considered a cause of autism, which is largely attributed to genetic factors. British physician Michael Fitzpatrick, who is also the parent of an autistic child, has criticized the biomedical movement promoting chelation. He notes that this approach tends to frame autistic individuals as "polluted" rather than as having a neurodevelopmental condition, a perspective that he argues risks dehumanizing the individual in pursuit of an imagined "real" child hidden behind the autism diagnosis.

== History ==
=== Origin of chelation in autism ===
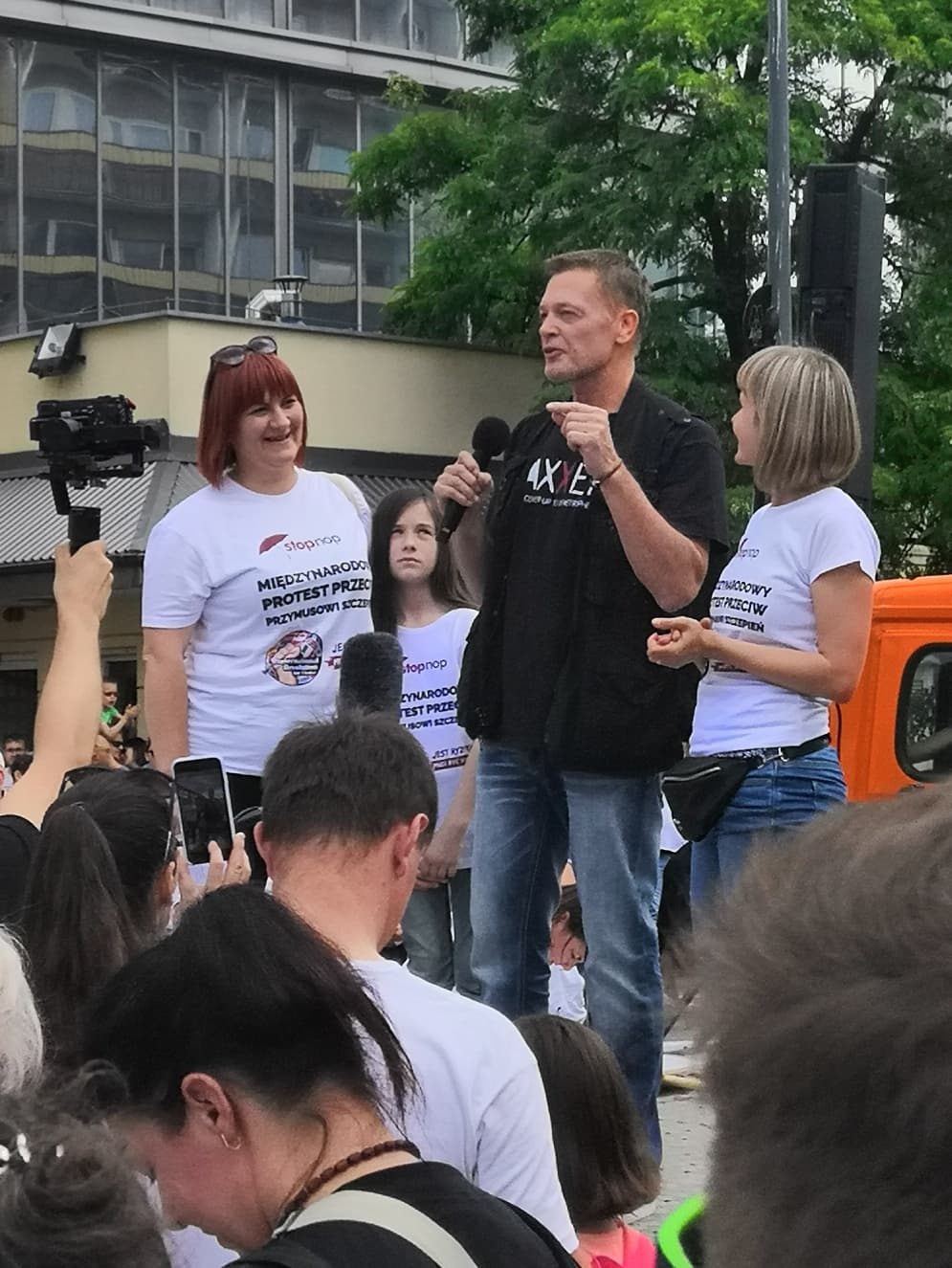
Andrew Wakefield, the former British surgeon behind the fraudulent idea that the measles-mumps-rubella vaccine is the cause of autism.

According to several authors, including Michael Fitzpatrick, the rise in popularity of chelation as an alternative treatment for autism is linked to the impact of a 1998 study by former British surgeon Andrew Wakefield, later discredited as fraudulent. The study falsely suggested a connection between the measles, mumps, and rubella (MMR) vaccine and the onset of autism. In 2001, the journal Medical Hypotheses published a paper characterizing autism as a form of mercury poisoning, which attracted significant media attention. In 2002, cell biologist Parris M. Kidd published two articles in the Alternative Medicine Review, proposing mercury as a possible cause of autism and suggesting that chelation therapy could serve as a treatment. In subsequent years, researchers Mark and David Geier released numerous publications asserting a link between mercury exposure and autism, and promoting chelation as a therapeutic intervention.

The hypothesis that autism is caused by mercury poisoning persisted despite the official retraction of Andrew Wakefield's fraudulent study and the lack of scientific evidence linking thiomersal, a preservative used in some vaccines, to autism. Alternative sources of mercury exposure, such as dental amalgams, fish consumption, and certain nasal sprays, were also proposed, although no connection with autism has been established.

According to Dr. Jeffrey Brent of the University of Colorado at Denver, claims linking heavy metals to autism are often based on studies conducted by laboratories that promote their services online to both the public and alternative medicine practitioners. (Note: Brent 2013, p. 370) These studies are typically of low methodological quality and are frequently published in journals with limited scientific credibility.

=== Spread and warnings in North America ===
Despite the absence of scientific evidence supporting the presence of lead or mercury poisoning in autistic individuals, heavy metal chelation has been promoted and practiced as a treatment in North America. It is often marketed as a "miracle cure" and targets families seeking solutions, which can involve substantial financial costs. According to Scientific American (2010), journalist Nancy Shute estimated the cost of chelation treatment at approximately $3,000 per semester.

In 2004, a survey of 552 American parents of autistic children reported that 7% of the children were undergoing chelation treatment. A 2005 survey of 74 parents in New York and New Jersey found that 8% had administered chelating agents to their children. In 2009, an online survey conducted by the Autism Research Institute (ARI), an organization known for supporting controversial autism-related theories, indicated that 74% of 26,000 respondents believed chelation improved their child's behavior, while 26% saw no change and 3% reported a worsening. However, the survey did not specify which chelating agents were used, limiting the interpretability of the results. Another survey conducted the same year among 479 parents reported that 32 children had undergone chelation, with approximately half of the parents observing behavioral improvement and 6% reporting worsening symptoms. The most frequently reported behavioral change was a reduction in hyperactivity.

In 2013, toxicologist Jeffrey Brent estimated that approximately 500,000 autistic children in the United States were undergoing chelation therapy annually, despite a lack of clinical evidence indicating serious heavy metal poisoning. Brent characterized this widespread use as a form of patient abuse.

A 2009 survey of American physicians found that none officially recommended chelation for autism. Among respondents, 61% advised against its use, while 26% reported insufficient knowledge to express an opinion. Brent suggested that, in the absence of official guidelines, physicians may rely on informal decision-making influenced by the preferences of patients or their families.

In 2016, Canadian author Nathalie Champoux stated in Le Journal de Montréal, recounting her book Être et ne plus être autiste, that she had used plant-based chelation and claimed the disappearance of autistic traits in her two sons. Similar testimonials appear in the book The Thinking Moms' Revolution (2013, reprinted in 2015), presented by its publisher as a collection of personal accounts from parents seeking treatments for their autistic children.

In August 2018, CBC News aired a report describing chelation therapy for autistic children as a "dangerous and unproven" practice. The report included expert commentary emphasizing the lack of evidence for benefits and the presence of documented risks. Rashid Buttar, a figure known for spreading medical misinformation during the COVID-19 pandemic, was also an advocate of chelation for autism.

=== Spread and warnings in France ===
Dr. Corinne Skorupka, a physician trained in the Defeat Autism Now! (DAN!) approach in the United States, promoted chelation therapy during a conference held in Paris in October 2002. In 2014, she co-authored the book Autisme: On peut en guérir with Laurène Amet, which included a preface by Luc Montagnier. An analysis of the book by journalist Olivia Cattan noted that it presented chelation as yielding "spectacular" outcomes. In 2012, the French advocacy group Egalited published a warning on its website concerning the risks associated with chelation therapy. The group denounced sectarian practices within the autism community and referenced a critical article from the website charlatans.info, which cited reported deaths and the discontinuation of several related studies.

Senta Depuydt, a Brussels-based journalist and advocate of alternative educational and nutritional approaches, expressed support for chelation therapy during the "Sortir de l'autisme" conference she organized in Paris in January 2016. She also promoted chelation as a "last resort" in a special feature published in the magazine Alternative Santé in April 2018. In 2017, French author Christine Buscailhon claimed that a combination of dietary changes and "gentle" chelation had led to the recovery of her son from autism, a claim later republished in 2020.

In July 2018, the association SOS Autisme France issued a warning against chelation therapy, describing it as a pseudo-treatment and noting strong reactions from its proponents. In April 2019, a mother of an autistic child reported to the press that, after joining Facebook groups dedicated to autism, she observed the promotion of chelation by individuals claiming it could "cure autism." Parents were reportedly encouraged to send hair samples to the United States for analysis and to purchase chelating agents from abroad for treatment regimens lasting up to six years.

In December 2019, the French television program Complément d'enquête on the France 2 channel aired a report by Lorraine Gublin titled "Autisme: voyage vers l'inconnu", which included the case of a French father who paid a German naturopath to administer monthly intravenous chelation treatments to his daughter. The absence of a clear condemnation of this practice by the interministerial delegate for autism, Claire Compagnon, was criticized by a French association representing autistic individuals, which expressed concern over the potential risks to autistic people presented in the program.

In September 2020, the French National Agency for the Safety of Medicines and Health Products (ANSM) issued an alert after identifying cases of chelating agents being prescribed to autistic children in France over several months. Concurrently, Olivia Cattan, president of SOS Autisme France, published Le Livre noir de l'autisme, which reported on the promotion of chelation in various French-language books and websites focused on alternative medicine. Approximately fifty French physicians were reported to have prescribed chelating agents or antibiotics to autistic children outside authorized indications. The French Medical Council announced that it would initiate disciplinary proceedings in response.

== Principle ==
Chelation therapy involves the use of agents intended to remove heavy metals from the body, typically identified through diagnostic tests that are not validated for autism-related use. These metals are then excreted via urine or stool. (Note: Shore & Rastelli 2015, pp. 145–149) Due to limited acceptance of chelation within conventional medical practice, some families seek treatment from naturopaths, who are more likely to administer it. (Note: Shore & Rastelli 2015, p. 147) In France, chelation is sometimes combined with dietary modifications and long-term antibiotic treatments, such as those associated with the Chronimed protocol.

Given the limitations of existing studies and the unclear etiology of autism, researcher Dan Rossignol has noted that behavioral changes observed in children undergoing chelation therapy cannot conclusively be attributed to the elimination of heavy metals. Such changes may instead be the result of other effects of the treatment.

=== Heavy metal detection testing ===
Chelation therapy is typically preceded by tests that analyze blood, hair, or urine to assess levels of heavy metals. According to medical toxicologist Jeffrey Brent, urine tests are generally unreliable when conducted after the administration of a chelating agent, as comparing these results to reference ranges for non-chelated urine can lead to falsely elevated readings. Brent also questioned the reliability of hair analysis, citing the absence of well-established reference ranges and the difficulty in distinguishing between internal and external sources of contamination. (Note: Brent 2013, p. 371)

Researcher Dan Rossignol has noted that in certain studies on chelation in autistic children—such as those by James B. Adams and colleagues—it remains unclear whether elevated heavy metal levels were present prior to treatment or whether the observed clinical improvements were directly attributable to the chelation process.

=== Products used ===
Diagram of a dimercaptosuccinic acid molecule.

Plant-based methods (typically the Chlorella algae in capsule form combined with cilantro and wild garlic) are sometimes promoted, despite the lack of formal evidence of effectiveness.

As for pharmaceutical chelation, the most commonly administered chemical chelators to autistic individuals appear to be:

- DMSA (dimercaptosuccinic acid), a lead chelator, and, to a lesser extent, mercury, probably the most common;
- DMPS (sodium dimercaptopropanesulfonate), a better mercury chelator;
- EDTA (ethylenediaminetetraacetic acid), a lead chelator;
- Aerosols, whose effectiveness is very poorly documented. (Note: Shore & Rastelli 2015, p. 148)

These compounds are often administered without official prescription authorization and, in some cases, via unauthorized routes such as rectal or transdermal application. Websites selling dietary supplements frequently publish pseudoscientific content attributing the causes of autism to pollution and vaccines, to promote "natural" chelation products. Parents of autistic children can obtain these chelating agents through online retail platforms and access detailed descriptions of chelation protocols, including dosage and duration, via internet sources and publications on alternative medicine.

=== Monitoring, risks, and side effects ===
Chelation therapy can also remove essential minerals, such as zinc, stored in body tissues. (Note: Metz, Mulick & Butter 2005, p. 249) As a result, dietary supplements are often administered concurrently to compensate for these losses.

Chelating agents are associated with various side effects, including skin rashes and potential impacts on liver function. (Note: Shore & Rastelli 2015, p. 149) Ongoing medical supervision is generally recommended, including regular blood tests to monitor mineral levels. According to Mauk, approximately 10% of children treated with dimercaptosuccinic acid (DMSA), considered one of the safer chelators, experience gastrointestinal issues and elevated liver enzymes. Rossignol has stated that studies on chelation in autistic children suggest that, when properly administered, adverse effects are rare, idiosyncratic, and reversible. In 2010, Rossignol was sued for allegedly prescribing medically unnecessary and unjustified chelation treatments.

Davisa et al. identified several side effects associated with the administration of chemical chelation agents, including fever, vomiting, diarrhea, loss of appetite, hypertension or hypotension, hemorrhoids, metallic taste, cardiac arrhythmias, and hypocalcemia. Hypocalcemia is considered the most serious of these effects, as it can result in fatal cardiac arrest.

== Published studies ==
Anecdotal reports have described behavioral improvements in autistic children following chelation therapy; however, for an extended period, no scientific studies demonstrated its efficacy. (Note: Metz, Mulick & Butter 2005, pp. 248–249) Dr. Joyce Elizabeth Mauk, writing in 2009 for the Association for Science in Autism Treatment, observed that several publications promoting chelation as a treatment for autism relied primarily on authors' opinions or personal experiences, often described as "pre-pilot" studies. A 2007 preliminary study involving ten children noted the scarcity of published research on the effects of chelation therapy or environmental control in cases of autism and attention deficit disorder.

In 2006, the U.S. National Institute of Mental Health (NIMH) proposed a clinical trial to assess the effectiveness of mercury chelation in autistic children, citing the frequent use of the oral chelating agent DMSA in this context. However, following the death of a child undergoing chelation in 2008 and criticism regarding the risks involved—especially given that none of the children had confirmed heavy metal poisoning—the NIMH canceled the trial before any participants were enrolled.

In 2008, Fitzpatrick highlighted that a frequently cited study supporting the use of chelation therapy for autistic children exposed to heavy metals, published in 2003, was authored by Jeff Bradstreet, a Florida physician affiliated with the Defeat Autism Now! (DAN!) program of the Autism Research Institute (ARI), along with Mark Geier and his son. All three individuals were noted to have potential conflicts of interest regarding the subject. (Note: Fitzpatrick 2008, p. 106) Mark Geier was barred from practicing medicine in the United States in 2011 due to misrepresentations of his medical qualifications, misleading claims related to autism, and the administration of unproven treatments, including those that resulted in the chemical castration of autistic children. In 2008, a two-part study was published in BMC Clinical Pharmacology by James B. Adams, Jeff Bradstreet, and others. The study concluded that DMSA treatment appeared to be reasonably safe for autistic children who exhibited elevated urinary excretion of toxic metals and might contribute to reducing certain autism symptoms.

In 2009, Dr. Daniel A. Rossignol of the International Child Development Resource Center in Melbourne, Florida, stated that available studies on chelation in autistic children indicated that, when properly administered, its side effects were rare, idiosyncratic, and reversible. Rossignol, who was affiliated with the Defeat Autism Now! (DAN!) program and the scientific advisory board of Generation Rescue assessed chelation therapy as Grade C in terms of evidence levels for emerging autism treatments. This grade indicates that none of the reviewed studies met the criteria for controlled and randomized trials. He concluded that chelation might be a potential treatment option for certain autistic individuals who exhibit a high burden of heavy metals.

In July 2013, Tonya N. Davis, Professor of Educational Psychology, and her team published a literature review on heavy metal chelation in autistic children. The review analyzed five studies, all involving pediatric subjects. Four studies reported mixed outcomes, while one reported positive results based on an anecdotal parental account published in 1996. Several of the studies reviewed had methodological limitations, including the absence of control groups in three cases. These limitations prevent the establishment of scientific support for chelation as an effective treatment for reducing autism symptoms.

In 2014, the Cochrane Collaboration identified ethical concerns regarding clinical trials involving chelation therapy in autistic children, citing the associated risks. The organization stated that further trials should not be conducted without first establishing a causal link between heavy metal exposure and autism, and without ensuring participant safety. In the same year, Egyptian physician Heba A. Yassa of the University of Assiut published an article in Environmental Toxicology and Pharmacology asserting that chelating agents could be used in the treatment of autism spectrum disorders and that detoxification with these agents played a role in improving the health of affected children. This position differed from the prevailing scientific consensus at the time.

=== Official non-recommendations ===
In 2012, the French Haute Autorité de santé did not recommend heavy metal chelation as an intervention for autism spectrum disorders. Similarly, in 2014, the Belgian Health Care Knowledge Centre (KCE) advised against its use, along with other complementary biomedical interventions, citing high financial costs and limited evidence of efficacy.

Also in 2014, the Cochrane Collaboration reviewed the available research and identified only one low-quality study evaluating the effectiveness of chelation in autistic individuals. It concluded that there was no clinical trial evidence supporting pharmaceutical chelation as an effective treatment for autism. The review also noted serious potential adverse effects, including disruptions in blood calcium levels, kidney issues, and reported fatalities, concluding that the risks of pharmaceutical chelation outweigh any known benefits.

In 2016, the U.S. Food and Drug Administration (FDA) posted a resource to its website that warned consumers about the dangers of using unapproved over-the-counter chelation-therapy products to treat "serious and incurable" conditions, including autism, cardiovascular disease, Alzheimer's disease, Parkinson's disease and complications from diabetes. The FDA expressed concern over the possible side effects of these products, including dehydration, kidney failure and death, as well as the potential harm of delaying legitimate care. In 2019, the FDA posted another resource to its website, which warned against the use of various alternative autism treatments the agency labeled deceptive, misleading and potentially dangerous. In addition to chelation therapy (and its subtypes, such as detoxifying clay baths), this included hyperbaric oxygen therapy, raw camel milk, chlorine dioxide and essential oils. The agency warned that chelating important minerals needed by the body could result in "serious and life-threatening outcomes." The FDA removed the 2019 resource in December 2025 under what an agency representative described as a "routine cleanup" of the website.

In 2018, Niamh C. Lagan and Joanne Balfe of Tallaght Hospital in Dublin reported in The BMJ that there was no evidence supporting a reduction in autism symptoms following chelation therapy.

In 2020, the European Society for Child and Adolescent Psychiatry (ESCAP) issued an official position statement, co-authored by Joaquin Fuentes, Amaia Hervás, and Patricia Howlin. The document stated that no medications are currently available to treat the core symptoms of autism, and that alternative interventions—such as neurofeedback, facilitated communication, auditory integration training, omega-3 fatty acids, secretin, chelation, hyperbaric oxygen therapy, and exclusion diets—are not considered appropriate treatments for the core characteristics of autism.

=== Deaths ===
In 2006, three cases of child deaths in the United States between 2003 and 2005 were reported following the use of EDTA-based chelation therapy. A 2008 article by Arla J. Baxter and Edward P. Krenzelok, published in Clinical Toxicology, described the case of a five-year-old autistic child who died from hypocalcemia and subsequent cardiac arrest after being intravenously administered the incorrect chelating agent (EDTA). The authors concluded that the effectiveness of chelation therapy for autistic children had not been validated and that it may pose risks.

Despite public concern following these cases, including one widely publicized incident, the use and promotion of chelation therapy for autistic children continued among proponents of biomedical approaches.

== See also ==
- Chelation therapy
- Heavy metals
- Alternative medicine

== Bibliography ==
=== Scientific articles and books ===
- Brent, Jeffrey (2013). "Commentary on the Abuse of Metal Chelation Therapy in Patients with Autism Spectrum Disorders". Journal of Medical Toxicology. 9 (4): 370–372. doi:10.1007/s13181-013-0345-4. ISSN 1937-6995. PMC 3846967. PMID 24113859."Commentary on the Abuse of Metal Chelation Therapy in Patients with Autism Spectrum Disorders". Journal of Medical Toxicology.
- Crisponi, Guido; Nurchi, Valeria; Lachowicz, Joanna; Crespo-Alonso, Miriam (2015). "Kill or cure: Misuse of chelation therapy for human diseases". Coordination Chemistry Reviews. 284: 278–285. doi:10.1016/j.ccr.2014.04.023."Commentary on the Abuse of Metal Chelation Therapy in Patients with Autism Spectrum Disorders". Journal of Medical Toxicology.
- Davisa, Tonya; O'Reill, Mark; Kang, Soyeon; Lang, Russell; Rispoli, Mandy; Sigafoos, Jeff; Lancioni, Giulio; Copeland, Daelynn; Attai, Shanna; Mulloy, Austin (2013). "Chelation treatment for autism spectrum disorders: A systematic review". Research in Autism Spectrum Disorders. 7 (1): 49–55. doi:10.1016/j.rasd.2012.06.005. ISSN 1750-9467.
- Fitzpatrick, Michael (2008). Defeating Autism: A damaging illusion. Routledge. doi:10.4324/9780203888391. ISBN 978-1-134-05898-3.
- Metz, Bernard; Mulick, James; Butter, Eric (2005). "Autism: A late-20th-century Fad Magnet". Controversial Therapies for Developmental Disabilities: Fad, Fashion, and Science in Professional Practice. CRC Press. ISBN 1-135-63611-7.
- Sinha, Yashwant; Silove, Natalie; Williams, Katrina (2006). "Chelation therapy and autism". The BMJ. 333 (7571): 756. doi:10.1136/bmj.333.7571.756. ISSN 0959-8138. PMC 1592402. PMID 17023484.

=== Non-scientific works ===
- Cattan, Olivia (2020). Le livre noir de l'autisme [The black book of autism] (in French). Le Cherche midi. ISBN 978-2-7491-6390-1.
  - This work describes various aberrations in the field of autism, including chelation.
- Shore, Stephen; Rastelli, Linda (2015). Comprendre l'autisme pour les nuls [Understanding autism for dummies] (in French). Éditions First. ISBN 978-2-7540-6581-8.
  - This book includes a chapter proposing chelation as a heavy metal detoxification treatment, which is not in line with current knowledge.
- Skorupka, Corinne; Amet, Lorène (2014). Autisme: on peut en guérir [Autism: there is a cure] (in French). Éd. Mosaïque-santé. ISBN 978-2-84939-087-0.
  - The contents of this book are entirely pseudoscientific, including the belief that autism can be cured.
