= Auditory integration training =

Developing treatment for auditory disorders

Auditory integration training (AIT) is a procedure pioneered in France by Guy Bérard. Bérard promoted AIT as a cure for clinical depression and suicidal tendencies, along with what he said were very positive results for dyslexia and autism, although there has been very little empirical evidence regarding this assertion. AIT typically involves 20 half-hour sessions over 10 days listening to specially filtered and modulated music. It was used in the early 1990s as a treatment for autism. Since, it has been promoted as a treatment for ADHD, depression, and a wide variety of other disorders. AIT has not met scientific standards for efficacy that would justify its use as a treatment for any condition.

The American Academy of Pediatrics and three other professional organizations consider it an experimental procedure. The New York State Department of Health recommends that it not be used to treat young children with autism. The U.S. Food and Drug Administration (FDA) has banned the Audiokinetron, the original device used to perform AIT, from importation into the U.S. due to lack of evidence of medical benefit. The American Speech-Language-Hearing Association has concluded that AIT has not met scientific standards for safety.

== Training regimen ==
Auditory integration training (AIT) aims to address the sensory problems such as hearing distortions and hyperacusis. Hyperacusis is better understood as oversensitive hearing. Both of which are said to cause discomfort and confusion in people with learning disabilities, including autism spectrum disorders. These hypersensitivities are believed to interfere with a child's attention, comprehension, and ability to learn.

AIT training typically involves the child attending two 30-minute sessions per day, separated by a minimum of three hours, for ten consecutive working days. The child listens via headphones to a program of specially filtered and modulated music with wide frequency range. The program is modified for each child with certain frequencies of sound filtered using an electronic device, which randomly switches between low- and high-pass filtering for random durations between 1/4 and 2 seconds. The filtering device also varies the sound's intensity, creating a modulated effect. The volume is set as loud as possible without causing discomfort. If the listener has shown unusual sensitivities to certain frequencies, these may be filtered out additionally.

The original device for delivering this training, the Audiokinetron or Ears Education and Retraining System (EERS), was banned by the U.S. Food and Drug Administration from importation into the U.S. due to lack of evidence of medical benefit. Although no AIT device has been approved for marketing as a medical device by the FDA, devices used only to aid education are not subject to FDA regulation. Several other unapproved devices are now used to deliver AIT; one example is the Digital Auditory Aerobics (DAA) system, which replaced the Audiokinetron in the U.S., and which contains 20 half-hour CDs containing the output of the banned Audiokinetron, thus getting around the banned use of the original device.

Most AIT practitioners are speech-language pathologists or audiologists and occupational therapists; other practitioners include, psychologists, physicians, social workers, and teachers. No operator training is required for the DAA. However, the lack of proven benefit to clients has led the American Speech-Language-Hearing Association to warn its members that they may be found in violation of ASHA's Code of Ethics if they provide AIT services.

== Insufficient efficacy and evidence basis ==
A systematic review of randomized controlled trials of AIT found insufficient evidence to support its use; no significant adverse effects were reported.

Several professional organizations state that AIT should be considered experimental: these include the American Academy of Audiology, the American Speech-Language-Hearing Association, the American Academy of Pediatrics, and the Educational Audiology Association. After reviewing the available research, the New York State Department of Health concluded that AIT's efficacy had not been shown, and recommended that it not be used to treat young children with autism.

== History ==
Guy Bérard's Audition Égale Comportement (English translation Hearing Equals Behavior) was the first book about AIT. Annabel Stehli's The Sound of a Miracle told the story of the author's daughter, an autistic girl who received AIT treatment from Bérard. The latter anecdotal book provided wide publicity to AIT in the English-speaking world. By 1994, over 10,000 U.S. children and adults had received training, at a cost of around $1000 US to $1,300 US each, and AIT became a multimillion-dollar industry.

Dr Alfred Tomatis was a French ear, nose and throat specialist who spent time researching hearing losses and discovered a link between hearing and speech, which became the foundation of his auditive stimulation method. His research indicated that the voice contains frequencies heard by the ear; an imperfect ear when given the chance to hear correctly, the voice instantly and unconsciously improves; and it was possible to transform voice through auditive stimulation over time with the use of an electric ear. Tomatis theory continues to state that the brain can retrain itself by creating neutral pathways, which will compensate for an individual's dysfunctional brain structures or pathways. Tomatis had four theories on how the ear perceived sound and then how the brain processed those sounds. Filters to regulate sound which would alter or modified to focus on specific frequencies; an electronic gating mechanism enables the ear to attune itself automatically and spontaneously; provide a balance between left and right ears; and timing delay of sound reception between the bone and air conduction can be changed to slow down the processing of information internally and allow the individual to attend to incoming information. Tomatis believed a relationship needs to be established between the auditory and vestibular system.

AIT gained popularity in the early 1990s, supported by anecdotal evidence and promising but small trials. Preliminary research included such methodological flaws as lack of statistical power, lack of blinding, or lack of a control group. Later larger and better controlled studies failed to bear out the promise of AIT. The use of AIT is not supported outside of research protocols.

== See also ==
- Auditory neuropathy
