= Environmental Toxicology and Pharmacology =

- Discipline: Toxicology, environmental health
- Language: English
- Edited by: M. D. Coleman

Publication details
- Former name(s): European Journal of Pharmacology, Environmental Toxicology and Pharmacology Section
- History: 1992-present
- Publisher: Elsevier
- Frequency: Bimonthly
- Impact factor: 4.860 (2020)

Standard abbreviations
- ISO 4: Environ. Toxicol. Pharmacol.

Indexing
- CODEN: ETOPFR
- ISSN: 1382-6689

Links
- Journal homepage; Online access

Environmental Toxicology and Pharmacology is a bimonthly peer-reviewed scientific journal covering research on the toxicological and pharmacological effects of environmental contaminants. It is published by Elsevier and was established in 1992 as the Environmental Toxicology and Pharmacology Section of the European Journal of Pharmacology, obtaining its current name in February 1996, when it was founded by Jan H. Koeman (Agricultural University, Wageningen) and Nico. P. E. Vermeulen Vrije Universiteit Amsterdam. Vermeulen was editor-in-chief until 2017, when he retired and Michael D. Coleman (Aston University) took over. According to the Journal Citation Reports, the journal has a 2020 impact factor of 4.860 The journal is included in the Index Medicus and in MEDLINE.
