= Alternative therapies for developmental and learning disabilities =

Discredited or unproven treatments for developmental and learning disabilities

Alternative therapies for developmental and learning disabilities include a range of practices used in the treatment of dyslexia, attention deficit hyperactivity disorder (ADHD), autism, Down syndrome and other developmental and learning disabilities. Treatments include changes in diet, dietary supplements, biofeedback, chelation therapy, homeopathy, massage and yoga. These therapies generally rely on theories that have little scientific basis, lacking well-controlled, large, randomized trials to demonstrate safety and efficacy; small trials that have reported beneficial effects can be generally explained by the ordinary waxing and waning of the underlying conditions.

== Treatment needs ==
There are a number of non-standard treatments for developmental and learning disabilities. There is demand for alternative therapies, particularly when a condition lacks a reliable remediation. For example, there is no cure for autism; the main goals of mainstream behavioral and medical management are to lessen associated deficits and family distress, and to increase quality of life and functional independence. Some alternative therapies, such as gluten-free, casein-free diets, may be appealing to some parents because the treatment recommended by most experts is thought to be "cold and manipulative". Parents may also consider a drug treatment for ADHD as avoidable. Alternative treatments to a stimulant medication range from natural products to psychotherapeutic techniques and highly technological interventions. It has been argued that, although texts that promote alternative therapies do not directly accuse parents of inadequacy, the claims that the disability is caused by certain factors, such as poor nutrition, supports the culture of mother-blame.

== Prevalence ==
From 12% to 64% of families of a child with ADHD use an alternative therapy, with the lower estimates likely come from narrower definitions of complementary and alternative medicine (CAM). School teachers, family and friends are the most common source of suggestion of alternative therapies for ADHD. In 2003, 64 percent of families of a child with special health care needs reported that they used alternative therapies. These therapies included spiritual healing, massage, chiropractic, herbs and special diets, homeopathy, self-hypnosis and other methods of CAM. The need for an alternative therapy was related to the child's condition and to its evaluation as repairable or not. A 2008 study found that about 40% of autistic Hong Kong children were treated with CAM, with the most popular therapies being acupuncture, sensory integration therapy, and Chinese herbology; the 40% is a lower prevalence than in Canada and the United States, where biological-based therapies, such as special diets, predominate. In the United States (as of 2009), CAM is used by an estimated 20–40% of non-disabled children, 30–70% of children with special health care needs, and 52–95% of autistic children; a 2009 survey of U.S. primary care physicians found that more of them recommended than discouraged multivitamins, essential fatty acids, melatonin, and probiotics as CAM treatments for autism.

== Evidence basis ==
Complementary and alternative medicine often lacks support in scientific evidence, so its safety and efficacy may be questionable.

While some experts encourage parents to be open-minded, others argue that treatments and services with no proven efficacy have opportunity costs because they displace the opportunity to participate in efficient treatments and services. According to Scott O. Lilienfeld,

many individuals who spend large amounts of time and money on ineffective treatments may be left with precious little of either. As a result, they may forfeit the opportunity to obtain treatments that could be more helpful. Thus, even ineffective treatments that are by themselves innocuous can indirectly produce negative consequences.

There is often little or no scientific evidence for effectiveness of alternative therapies.

== See also ==
- Attention deficit hyperactivity disorder management – Practices with established treatment efficacy for ADHD
- List of alternative therapies for developmental and learning disabilities – Discredited or unproven therapies
