= List of films about autism =

This is a list of autism-related films:

== Fiction films ==
- The Accountant (2016) stars American actor Ben Affleck as an autistic forensic accountant.
- The Accountant 2 (2025) is a sequel to The Accountant, with Ben Affleck returning in the leading role.
- Adam.
- After Thomas.
- Ataru: The First Love & the Last Kill.
- Barfi!.
- Beautiful Pain.
- Ben X.
- The Big Short (2015) features Welsh actor Christian Bale as American hedge fund manager Michael Burry, who recognised traits of Asperger syndrome in himself after his son's diagnosis.
- The Black Balloon.
- Bless the Child.
- A Boy Called Po.
- The Boy Who Could Fly.
- Change of Habit (1969) stars American singer and actor Elvis Presley. It portrays an autistic girl receiving a coercive treatment developed by American psychologist Robert Zaslow.
- Cries from the Heart.
- David's Mother.
- Dear John.
- Extremely Loud & Incredibly Close.
- Ezra.
- The Fanatic.
- Fly Away.
- Haridas.
- Jack of the Red Hearts.
- Jane Wants a Boyfriend.
- Le Goût des merveilles (2015) is a French romantic comedy featuring a man with Asperger syndrome.
- The Lighthouse of the Orcas.
- Look at Me.
- Loop (2020) is a Pixar animated short directed by filmmaker Erica Milsom. It follows a nonspeaking autistic girl and a talkative boy paired together on a canoeing trip. Consultants from the Autistic Self Advocacy Network helped develop the portrayal.
- Love Child.
- Magnificent 7 (2005) is a BBC drama inspired by British author Jacqui Jackson and her seven children.
- Malcolm.
- Marathon.
- Mary and Max.
- Mercury Rising.
- A Mile in His Shoes.
- Miracle Run.
- Molly.
- Monsieur je-sais-tout (2018) is a French comedy-drama about a football coach and his autistic nephew.
- Mozart and the Whale.
- Music (2021), directed by Australian singer-songwriter Sia, features a nonspeaking autistic character played by American actress Maddie Ziegler. The film drew criticism over its casting and depiction of restraint.
- My Name Is Khan.
- Ocean Heaven (2010) is a Chinese drama about a father preparing his autistic son for life after his death.
- One More Chance.
- Please Stand By (2017) follows an autistic young woman who leaves her group home to deliver a screenplay to a Star Trek writing competition.
- The Predator.
- Rain Man (1988) is an American film portraying an autistic man with savant abilities, or exceptional skills in particular areas. American psychologist Bernard Rimland advised on the portrayal.
- Season of Miracles.
- Silent Fall.
- Snow Cake.
- Somersault.
- Son-Rise: A Miracle of Love (1979) is a television film adapted from American author Barry Kaufman's book Son-Rise.
- The Specials (2019), released in French as Hors normes, is a French comedy-drama about people supporting autistic young people.
- Split.
- The Story of Luke.
- Superbror.
- Tanvi the Great.
- Temple Grandin (2010) is an HBO biographical television film about American autistic animal scientist and author Temple Grandin.
- The Unbreakable Boy.
- Under the Piano.
- White Frog.
- X+Y (2014), also released as A Brilliant Young Mind, features Nathan Ellis, an autistic teenage mathematician inspired by British mathematician Daniel Lightwing.

== Documentary films ==
- Autism Every Day.
- Autism in Love (2015). Follows four autistic adults as they explore dating and romantic relationships.
- Autism Is a World (2004). Profiles Sue Rubin, an autistic woman, and presents her use of facilitated communication, a scientifically discredited method.
- Autism: The Musical (2007). Follows five autistic children taking part in a musical theatre project.
- The Autistic Gardener (2015). A documentary series following a team of autistic gardeners.
- Chicos de otro planeta. Follows young Chileans with Asperger syndrome as they discuss their experiences and place in society.
- Children From The Distant Planet.
- Children of the Stars (2007). Follows a family attending a school for autistic children in Beijing and examines access to support in China.
- Citizen Autistic (2013). Examines autistic people's campaigns for their rights and criticism of the organisation Autism Speaks.
- Dad's in Heaven with Nixon.
- Deej (2017). Follows David James "DJ" Savarese, a nonspeaking autistic student. The film has been criticised for promoting facilitated communication without addressing the evidence against it.
- Extreme Love: Autism.
- "The Foolish Wise Ones" (1987). An episode of the BBC documentary series Q.E.D. featuring British autistic artist Stephen Wiltshire.
- Girls with Autism (2015). Follows pupils at Limpsfield Grange School, a school for girls with autism and other support needs.
- The Horse Boy (2009). Follows a family travelling to Mongolia seeking help for their autistic son.
- How to Dance in Ohio.
- In a Different Key (2021). Based on In a Different Key: The Story of Autism, a book by American journalists John Donvan and Caren Zucker.
- "I Want My Little Boy Back" (1997). An episode of the BBC documentary series Q.E.D. following a family using the Son-Rise programme with their autistic child.
- Life, Animated.
- "Living with Autism" (2014). An episode of the BBC documentary series Horizon, presented by psychologist Uta Frith, exploring autism research and autistic people's experiences.
- Loving Lampposts (2010). Explores different views of autism through interviews with autistic people, parents and professionals.
- My Autism and Me (2011). A documentary for the BBC children's news programme Newsround, in which British autistic teenager Rosie King discusses her experiences and introduces other autistic young people.
- My Family and Autism (2003). Follows British autistic author Luke Jackson and his family.
- Neurotypical (2013). Explores the lives and views of autistic people of different ages.
- Normal People Scare Me.
- Normal People Scare Me Too.
- Paddy and Christine McGuinness: Our Family and Autism (2021). Follows British television personalities Paddy McGuinness and Christine McGuinness as they explore their experiences of raising three autistic children.
- Rachel, l'autisme à l'épreuve de la justice (2019). Examines a mother's custody dispute and the role of autism diagnoses in the case.
- The Reason I Jump.
- Recovered: Journeys Through the Autism Spectrum and Back.
- Refrigerator Mothers.
- Too Sane for This World.
- Vaxxed.
- Wretches & Jabberers (2011). Follows autistic artist Larry Bissonnette and autistic advocate Tracy Thresher as they challenge attitudes towards autism. The film presents their use of facilitated communication.
