= Ami Klin =

American psychologist

- Education: Hebrew University of Jerusalem; University College London
- Occupation: Psychologist
- Employer(s): Marcus Autism Center; Emory University School of Medicine; Yale Child Study Center (formerly)
- Known for: Autism research
- Notable work: An agenda for 21st century neurodevelopmental medicine: lessons from autism

Ami Klin is a clinical psychologist who researches autism. He is the first director of the Marcus Autism Center, a subsidiary of Children’s Healthcare of Atlanta. Klin is also a Georgia Research Alliance Eminent Scholar at Emory University School of Medicine and the director of the university's Division of Autism and Related Developmental Disabilities in its Department of Pediatrics.

== Background and education ==
Klin was born in Brazil to parents who were survivors of the Holocaust.

Klin earned undergraduate degrees in psychology, political science and history from the Hebrew University of Jerusalem in 1983 and his doctorate in psychology at University College London in 1988 under the co-supervision of Uta Frith. He is board-certified in clinical psychology.

Klin worked as an autism researcher at the Yale Child Study Center from 1989 to 2010, where he was eventually appointed the Harris Professor of Child Psychology and Psychiatry.

== Awards ==
Klin has received numerous professional and academic awards and recognition including Researcher of the Year from Business New Haven in collaboration with Yale, Pearl H. Rieger Award for Excellence in Clinical Science from the Rush Medical Center in Chicago, and the Robert McKenzie Prize for Outstanding PhD Thesis from the University of London.

== Publications ==
Klin has published research in numerous medical journals and is the author or co-author of the books:

- Asperger Syndrome (2000, ISBN 978-1-57230-534-2)
- Autism Spectrum Disorders in Infants and Toddlers: Diagnosis, Assessment, and Treatment (2008, ASIN 001EHEBBM)
- Handbook of Autism and Pervasive Developmental Disorders, Diagnosis, Development, Neurobiology, and Behavior (Volume 1) (2005, ISBN 978-0-471-71696-9)
- Handbook of Autism and Pervasive Developmental Disorders, Assessment, Interventions, and Policy (Volume 2) (2005, ISBN 978-0-471-71697-6)
- The Autistic Spectrum: A Parents' Guide to Understanding and Helping Your Child (2001, ISBN 978-1-56975-257-9)

== Lectures ==
On February 27, 2015, Klin was a keynote speaker at the 14th Annual Alabama Autism Conference. His lecture was titled, Bringing Science to the Community: A New System of Healthcare Delivery for Infants and Toddlers with Autism Spectrum Disorders.

On May 24, 2025, Klin appeared with Center for Autism and Related Disorders founder and anti-vaccine activist Doreen Granpeesheh at the 51st annual convention of the Association for Behavior Analysis International. Klin and Granpeesheh gave a presentation focused on the early diagnosis of autism, which included the promotion of diagnostic technology Klin developed and holds a patent on.
