= Normal People Scare Me =

- Cover of DVD
- Directed by: Keri Bowers; Taylor Cross
- Written by: Joey Travolta; Jeff Less
- Produced by: Joey Travolta
- Starring: Taylor Cross
- Cinematography: Richard Bluth; Keri Bowers
- Edited by: Richard Bluth; Chad Dahlberg; Eric Jean
- Music by: Taylor Dayne
- Production company: Normal Films
- Release date: April 1, 2006
- Running time: 90 minutes
- Country: United States
- Language: English

Normal People Scare Me: A Film about Autism is a 2006 American documentary film about autism, produced by Joey Travolta. The project began as a 10-minute short film co-directed by an autistic teenager named Taylor Cross, and his mother Keri Bowers. Travolta first met Cross at a program Travolta led teaching the art of filmmaking to children with special needs. He mentored Cross, and the documentary was expanded into a feature-length film.

It includes interviews with 65 people, including those who are autistic as well as friends and family. Cross asks them about their experiences with autism and how they feel about it, and elicits multiple insightful responses from his subjects.

The short version was shown at a student film festival at Chaminade High School in West Hills, California in April 2004, and co-director Cross won multiple awards at the festival. In November 2004, Cross was honored at a gala benefit dinner for the Bubel-Aiken Foundation in Los Angeles, California; the foundation's co-creator is Clay Aiken of American Idol. The feature-length film was released on April 1, 2006, with special screenings at the Hot Springs Documentary Film Festival in October 2006, and the Staten Island Film Festival in 2007. The documentary received positive reception in the Daily News of Los Angeles, New York Daily News and the Tri-Valley Herald.

== Contents ==
The documentary's purpose is to educate the public to gain an understanding of autism. Taylor Cross interviews autistic boys and girls between the ages of 9 and 19, and asks them to describe their perspective on the world and to share their thoughts. The youngest autistic child to appear in the film is a boy named Ricky, and the oldest at age 19 shares the same name as the co-director, Taylor. An autistic boy named Brian appears in the film and voices frustration due to experiencing teasing from girls at his school. Brian's sister Elizabeth also appears in the film – she communicates with her brother in a language only the two of them comprehend. Cross also interviews parents of children with autism, including surfer Izzy Paskowitz. In addition, Cross interviews the dean of the film program at New York University.

Cross asks subjects in the film: "Do you like having autism?". One middle school girl responds "I feel okay. It makes things hard for me that might be easy for others." A little boy tells Cross: "Everyone's good at their own things." An autistic woman tells Cross "Yes, I do. Because why should I not--why should I feel bad about something I can't really change? I might as well look at the good things about it." Another boy says to Cross "I don't like being autistic", and when Cross asks why, the boy responds: "Because it's hard for me to have changes and all the other stuff." A woman states to Cross of her experiences with autism: "I cry, I scream, I wish to God I wasn't different and I didn't have to struggle with everything ...", and a boy tells him of the negative aspects of the condition: "The bad thing about autism is that it gets hard to understand other people and to understand what people say and what--what other people try to tell me to do and how to explain me better."

"Why should I feel bad about something I can't really change? I might as well look at the good things about it."

— Woman with autism

When Cross asks his subjects "Tell me how you feel about having autism", he elicits responses including: "I have first thought, because people don't understand me", "Over the years I have come to accept it as a part of who I am. When I was younger I wanted to go away" and "It is not the biggest part of my life but knowing that I have something that makes me a little different, it sometimes makes me question myself".

He also poses a question to the interviewees related to the film's title, and asks "Sometimes normal people are scary to kids with autism. They talk funny or too fast. Do normal people ever scare you?" Responses include "All the time", "Yes, because it is hard to keep up when people are talking", "Not really", "Yes. They do" and "A little, yes". Cross poses the question to those with autism: "What is normal anyway?". Cross interviews autistic students in the film and asks them to cite the most difficult things about their condition. Answers include "making friends" and "making people not hate you". All students acknowledge to Cross in the interviews that they have been teased for being different from others.

== Production ==
Taylor Cross, the film's co-director, was diagnosed with autism at the age of six. He is a high-functioning autistic. His mother is co-director Keri Bowers. Though Bowers was known internationally as an authority on the subject, she encountered challenges in dealing with her son's condition. Cross decided to make a documentary about autism when he was fourteen-years-old, in order to help others understand his challenges. In total, Taylor Cross interviewed 65 people with autism about their perspectives on the condition. Most of those interviewed in the film were fellow students of Cross's from Newbury Park High School.

The idea for the name of the film came to Cross from a T-shirt at a novelty store that had the phrase "Normal People Scare Me" printed on it. "I thought it was absolutely perfect", said Cross of the phrase he saw on the T-shirt. In an appearance on Sunday Today, Cross explained to Campbell Brown: "Yeah, I was thinking I--it actually just came off a T-shirt that I read, which totally makes sense either way because the real underlying message, if--if you've noticed it, even I haven't noticed it until like recently, like the whole underlying message is `What is normal anyway?' I mean, that just kind of gives it off in the title."

Prior to the longer version, the documentary began as a 10-minute film. "I was told by the doctors that my son would probably never walk or talk. Today's he's a high school freshman enrolled in regular classes, who wants to go to college and become a filmmaker", Keri Bowers said of her son. Cross told the Daily News of Los Angeles: "I want people to leave my film feeling uplifted and having a better understanding of what it's like to live in our world." The feature-length version of the film includes interviews with family members and friends of children with autism. Cross said work on the documentary was difficult: "It was long, and it was tedious. I swear on my grave that I'm not doing another documentary. It took two years to finish." During the film's production, Cross and Bowers appeared on a program hosted by Paula Zahn on CNN to discuss their work.

"He did all the interviewing and research. I kind of worked one-on-one with him."

— Joey Travolta

Taylor Dayne was a singer for a musical piece in the film, and Joey Travolta and Jeff Lass served as songwriters. The film was narrated by Graham Nash. The film's production company was Normal Films. Joey Travolta first met Cross at a program Travolta led teaching the art of filmmaking to children with special needs. Travolta, an autism activist, helped educate Cross about filmmaking, and assisted him in getting his message out to a wider audience. Joey Travolta is a former special education teacher, and at the time of the film's production operated a children's film and acting workshop called Entertainment Experience. "So I mentored him with lights and the camera and editing. He did all the interviewing and research. I kind of worked one-on-one with him", said Travolta of his work with Taylor Cross. Joey Travolta started the organization Actors for Autism, which assists those with the condition to create films. "I dedicated my life to this. I love working with kids and I love making films", said Travolta to The Bakersfield Californian. Travolta commented on the impact of the film: "It was like a domino effect. And I found my calling." After his experiences working on the film, Travolta began to teach film to autistic children at camps in California, Florida, and Michigan.

== Release ==
The short film version was shown at a student film festival at Chaminade High School in West Hills, California in April 2004. Joey Travolta's daughter attended Chaminade High School, and he assisted in putting together the student film festival at the school. There was also a screening held in 2004 by the Ventura County Autism Society. The 10-minute film was shown at the Flutie Bowl in Boston, Massachusetts in December 2005.

The feature-length version of the film was released on April 1, 2006. 2006 screenings included New York and Arkansas. The film was screened in October 2006 at the Hot Springs Documentary Film Festival. In April 2007, the Autism Society of Washington and the EWU and Washington State University Program for Communication Disorders sponsored a screening of the film at Eastern Washington University. Normal People Scare Me was featured as part of the Staten Island Film Festival in 2007. The 15th annual educational conference of the Developmental Disabilities Nurses Associations chose to feature a screening of the film at their 2007 meeting in New Mexico.

== Reception ==
=== Awards and recognition ===
Taylor Cross received three prizes when his film was screened at the student film festival at Chaminade High School in April 2004. In November 2004, Cross was honored for his work on the film, at the gala benefit dinner for the Bubel-Aiken Foundation in Los Angeles, California. The Bubel-Aiken Foundation is a nonprofit organization that was founded in 2003 by the mother of an autistic son, Diane Bubel, and Clay Aiken, star of American Idol.

=== Critical reception ===
"It's an extremely moving film."

— New York Daily News

A review of the short film version in the Daily News of Los Angeles was positive, and Dennis McCarthy wrote: "You'll see some smiles and some tears. Some anger and a lot of frustration. You'll see the world of autism through the eyes of some beautiful kids living there." Lenore Skenazy of New York Daily News wrote "It's an extremely moving film, mostly because it's impossible not to fall in love with the matter-of-fact kids on screen." The Tri-Valley Herald referred to the documentary as a "highly acclaimed film". When Keri Bowers and Taylor Cross appeared on Sunday Today in April 2006, host Campbell Brown said to them: "We are so excited about this and really glad to have you on. We appreciate it."

== See also ==
- Autism Is a World
- Autism Every Day
- Autism: The Musical
- The Transporters
