= Autism in popular culture =

Autism spectrum disorder (ASD) is a neurodevelopmental disorder currently defined in the fifth edition of the Diagnostic and Statistical Manual of Mental Disorders and the eleventh edition of the International Classification of Diseases. As with many neurodivergent people and conditions, the popular image of autistic people and autism itself is often based on inaccurate media representations. Additionally, media about autism and statements by political figures may promote pseudoscience such as vaccine denial or facilitated communication.

Since the 1970s, portrayals of autistic people (and now-defunct autism subtypes, such as Asperger syndrome) have become more frequent, and contemporary portrayals of autism in the past two decades are listed. Public perception of autism is often based on these fictional portrayals in novels, biographies, movies, and television series. Portrayals of autism in popular culture have limitations that recent developments hope to address through consulting experts and those with lived experiences. Increased awareness of autism from notable figures and users on social media who discuss their lived experiences have also shaped understanding of the condition in popular culture.

== Autism in popular culture ==
- Singer's 1998 thesis Odd People In: The Birth of Community Amongst People on the Autistic Spectrum, wherein she had first coined the term neurodiversity, was republished as Neurodiversity: The Birth of an Idea in September 2017.
- A play about an autistic child, All in a Row was first performed in the UK in February 2019. It generated controversy, including for its use of a puppet to portray its lead character, while the others were portrayed by humans.
- Barbie Fashionistas doll #245 is the brand's first doll representing the autistic community and was developed through collaboration with the Autistic Self Advocacy Network (ASAN). She was manufactured in January 2026 with accessories like noise cancelling headphones and an Augmentative and Alternative Communication (AAC) tablet, that represent differences in sensory and communication for those with autism.

== Television ==
- An American iteration of Israeli comedy-drama On the Spectrum, titled As We See It, was first released in 2022.
- American TV series Atypical, which centres on an autistic 18-year-old named Sam Gardner, was first released in August 2017.
- The Big Bang Theory (2007). American actor Jim Parsons recognised similarities between Sheldon Cooper and accounts of Asperger syndrome, although the writers rejected that diagnosis. Cooper later became the central character in Young Sheldon.
- The Bridge, a Danish-Swedish crime drama TV series, premiered in Denmark and Sweden on September 21, 2011. The Swedish detective in the series is suggested, but never stated, as being autistic. It was not originally the intention of the writers, but many viewers came to interpret the character as autistic. It later came to be partially written into the series, and the actress has said "To me, she has Asperger's".
- Bright Minds is a Franco-Belgian TV police/crime series about an autistic woman who works as an archivist for the Judicial Police that first premiered in April 2019. She assists a female police officer in her criminal investigations.
- Carl the Collector is an English-language children's animated television series about an autistic raccoon that first aired in November 2024.
- "Conall", Directions (1965). An autistic boy's family told his story in this American television episode.
- Freeform comedy drama Everything's Gonna Be Okay premiered on January 16th, 2020 and features Matilda, a character with autism. Matilda is played by Kayla Cromer, an actress who was diagnosed with autism at the age of seven.
- Extraordinary Attorney Woo is a South Korean TV series about an autistic woman that first aired in June 2022.
- Good Doctor, a South Korean television series featuring an autistic doctor, first aired in 2013. An American adaptation, The Good Doctor, premiered in 2017, followed by the Japanese adaptation Good Doctor in 2018 and the Turkish adaptation Mucize Doktor in 2019.
- In 2023, the BBC released a TV series based on A Kind of Spark, a children's book by British author Elle McNicoll.
- The US iteration of Australian reality television show Love on the Spectrum was released in May 2022.
- Love on the Spectrum (2019–2021), an Australian reality television show that first aired November 2019, follows autistic people as they explore the dating world.
- Israeli comedy-drama On the Spectrum first aired in May 2018. It won Israel's best drama award.
- Pablo is a British pre-school children's TV program about an autistic boy. It was first aired in October 2017. A number of books have subsequently been adapted from the series.
- The Rehearsal (2025). In Season 2, Episode 5 Nathan ingratiates himself with Doreen Granpeesheh of the Center for Autism and Related Disorders to position himself as a "thought leader" in the autism field, though he tries to deflect any implication that he himself may be autistic.
- A four-year-old autistic girl Muppet named Julia joined the main Sesame Street show in April 2017 after being first introduced in 2015 as part of the Sesame Street and Autism: See Amazing in All Children initiative.
- Star Trek (1966). Psychiatrist Geoff Lawrence-Smith discussed Spock as a character whose autistic traits could provide a positive role model for autistic people.
- Survivor season 48 (2025) features the first openly autistic player, Eva Erickson. Erickson ultimately placed second on the season and discussed her experience playing the game with autism during subsequent interviews.
- American TV series Touch first went on air in January 2012. It is a drama centring on a single father with an autistic son.
- Israeli TV drama Yellow Peppers first aired in December 2010. It featured a family caring for an autistic child. It won Israel's best TV drama award. A British version, The A Word, first aired in 2016. Greek and Dutch versions have also been made. An American version is currently in production.
- Australian factual TV series You Can't Ask That about different groups of unusual people began in 2016, and as of 2023 was subsequently remade in 11 other territories. The Israeli version broadcast an episode about people on the autistic spectrum in 2018. The Canadian version followed in 2019, and the Australian one did likewise in 2020. An American version of the series is currently in production.

== Limitations of contemporary representation of autism in popular culture ==
Limitations in the representation of autism in popular culture are secondary to the perception that those with autism are a monolith, instead of a community that presents on a spectrum of diverse lived experiences. Earlier depictions of autism up to the late 2010s overrepresented minority experiences of the autism spectrum, like savant syndrome or restrictive behaviors. These depictions often sensationalized those with autism as other-worldly and limited their presence in the story to that of a savior or burden to the surrounding characters, removing the agency and variety that colors autistic people's experiences in the real world. A systemic review assessing autism representation in popular culture found that most depictions of autism from the 1980s to 2010s focused on severe presentations of autism as scored using the CARS2-ST and DSM-5, diagnostic tools used to assess autistic traits in children and adults, respectively. Additionally, characters depicted with autism in earlier contemporary works were overwhelmingly white and male.

== Progress in contemporary representation of autism in popular culture ==
This overrepresentation of certain patient demographics and minority features of autism is being addressed in the more contemporary fictional works of the 2020s through more varied depictions of the condition. These variations include diverse racial and gender demographics as well as behavioral presentations of autism. One example of this diversity in autism presentation is Julia, the Sesame Street muppet. On the CARS2-ST, Julia is categorized as having mild to moderate autism. Casting actors with autism, such as Kayla Cromer and Tal Anderson, to represent neurodivergent characters demonstrates another improvement in appropriately depicting neurodivergence on screen. Anderson's Becca King's storyline in the second season of the Pitt is centered on the autonomy of those with differing abilities.

== MMR vaccine theory ==
The MMR vaccine was the subject of controversy resulting from publication of a (now retracted) 1998 paper by Andrew Wakefield et al. In 2010, Wakefield's research was found by the General Medical Council to have been "dishonest"; the research was declared fraudulent in 2011 by The BMJ.

A March 2007 article in BMC Public Health postulated that media reports on Wakefield's study had "created the misleading impression that the evidence for the link with autism was as substantial as the evidence against". Earlier papers in Communication in Medicine and British Medical Journal concluded that media reports provided a misleading picture of the level of support for Wakefield's theory.

PRWeek noted that after Wakefield was removed from the general medical register for misconduct in May 2010, 62% of respondents to a poll regarding the MMR controversy stated they did not feel that the media conducted responsible reporting on health issues.

A New England Journal of Medicine article examining the history of antivaccinationists said that opposition to vaccines has existed since the 19th century, but "now the antivaccinationists' media of choice are typically television and the Internet, including its social media outlets, which are used to sway public opinion and distract attention from scientific evidence".

The role of the media in the sensationalization of the MMR vaccination issue was discussed by The BMJ:

The original paper has received so much media attention, with such potential to damage public health, that it is hard to find a parallel in the history of medical science. Many other medical frauds have been exposed, but usually more quickly after publication and on less important health issues.

Concerns were also raised about the role of journalists reporting on scientific theories that they "are hardly in a position to question and comprehend. Neil Cameron, a historian who specializes in the history of science, writing for The Montreal Gazette labeled the controversy a "failure of journalism" that resulted in unnecessary deaths, saying that 1) The Lancet should not have published a study based on "statistically meaningless results" from only 12 cases; 2) the anti-vaccination crusade was continued by the satirical Private Eye magazine; and 3) a grapevine of worried parents and "nincompoop" celebrities fueled the widespread fears. The Gazette also reported that:

There is no guarantee that debunking the original study is going to sway all parents. Medical experts are going to have to work hard to try to undo the damage inflicted by what is apparently a rogue medical researcher whose work was inadequately vetted by a top-ranked international journal.

== Acetaminophen theory ==
Donald Trump's administration released statements in September 2025 about the causality of autism. In the statements, acetaminophen (paracetamol) use in pregnancy was erroneously credited to cause autism. This press conference followed rhetoric by Secretary of Health and Human Services Robert F. Kennedy Jr about an "autism epidemic" that he aimed to find the cause of by specific deadline, "By September, we will know what has caused the autism epidemic and we'll be able to eliminate those exposures." Increased prevalence of autism has been tied to improved diagnostic practices and broadened criteria that better captures a wide spectrum of presentations as opposed to a single environmental factor.

== Social media and autism ==
The advent of social media has given members of the general public opportunities to self-platform. This access to marginalized communities and experiences has given social media users an opportunity to learn more about the autism community. Despite this possibility, most content on Youtube and Tiktok regarding autism is anecdotal, describing individuals' experiences with ASD as opposed to educational information on symptoms and management. Misinformation regarding autism increases the possibility of false self-diagnosis for those who consume autism related social media content. Analysis of engagement with autism content on Youtube showed that societal attitudes towards the condition were not influenced by access to related content.

== Facilitated communication and rapid prompting ==
A number of books and films exist that promote the scientifically discredited techniques of facilitated communication and rapid prompting as legitimate, such as:

=== Films ===
- Annie's Coming Out
- Autism Is a World
- Deej
- Wretches & Jabberers

=== Books ===
- The Reason I Jump
- Fall Down 7 Times Get Up 8

== Notable individuals ==
Some notable figures such as American animal handling systems designer and author Temple Grandin, American Pulitzer Prize-winning music critic and author Tim Page, and Swedish environmental activist Greta Thunberg are autistic. Thunberg, who in August 2018 started the "School strike for climate" movement, has explained how the "gift" of living with Asperger syndrome helps her "see things from outside the box" when it comes to climate change. In an interview with presenter Nick Robinson on BBC Radio 4's Today, the then-16-year-old activist said that autism helps her see things in "black and white". She went on to say:

It makes me different, and being different is a gift, I would say. It also makes me see things from outside the box. I don't easily fall for lies, I can see through things. I don't think I would be interested in the climate at all, if I had been like everyone else. Many people say that it doesn't matter, you can cheat sometimes. But I can't do that. You can't be a little bit sustainable. Either you're sustainable, or not sustainable. For way too long the politicians and people in power have got away with not doing anything at all to fight the climate crisis and ecological crisis, but we will make sure that they will not get away with it any longer.

Billionaire Elon Musk announced on Saturday Night Live in May 2021 that he has been diagnosed with Asperger's syndrome, although it was later revealed that he has never been medically diagnosed. This announcement drew criticism from the autistic community. Other websites (for example) have lists of famous persons identified as autistic, though not all have been formally diagnosed. Additionally, media speculation of contemporary figures as being on the autism spectrum has become popular in recent times. New York magazine reported some examples, which included that Time magazine suggested that Bill Gates is autistic, and that a biographer of Warren Buffett wrote that his prodigious memory and "fascination with numbers" give him "a vaguely autistic aura". The magazine also reported that on Celebrity Rehab, Dr. Drew Pinsky deemed basketball player Dennis Rodman a candidate for an Asperger's diagnosis, and the UCLA specialist consulted "seemed to concur". Nora Ephron criticized these conclusions, writing that popular speculative diagnoses suggest autism is "an epidemic, or else a wildly over-diagnosed thing that there used to be other words for". Thomas Sowell has criticized Time's diagnosis of Gates, saying that the people diagnosing him have not seen him personally. Wentworth Miller, lead actor of television show Prison Break, made headlines in 2021 after revealing that he was diagnosed with autism as an adult. In an Instagram post, he details his experience contextualizing past experiences with his subsequent diagnosis.

== See also ==
- Societal and cultural aspects of autism
- History of autism
