= Autism in Love =

- Directed by: Matt Fuller
- Written by: Ira Heilveil
- Produced by: Matt Fuller, Carolina Groppa
- Edited by: Alex O'Flinn
- Music by: Mac Quayle
- Release date: April 16, 2015 (Tribeca Film Festival)
- Country: United States
- Language: English

Autism in Love is an American documentary film released in 2015.

== Synopsis ==
The film follows four autistic adults, Dave, Lindsey, Lenny, and Stephen, and explores the concepts of love, romance, and parental relationships. Dave and Lindsey, who are both autistic, have been romantically involved for eight years. At the end of the film, they decide to get married. Lenny is a young adult who lives with his single mother. Stephen has been married for over 20 years. The film shows his struggles with his wife's terminal illness.

== Release ==
The film premiered at the Tribeca Film Festival in April 2015, and was part of the PBS series Independent Lens in 2016.

== Reception ==
Huffington Post called the film "touching". The Daily Beast called it "bracingly intimate" and said it "raises questions about love and life that strike a universal chord and have nothing to do with being on the [autism] spectrum."

== See also ==
- List of films about autism
- Autism in popular culture
