= Michael Fitzpatrick (physician) =

British general practitioner

- Born: 1950 (age 75–76)
- Occupation: General practitioner
- Known for: Writing about autism therapies, MMR vaccine controversy
- Spouse: Mary Fitzpatrick
- Children: 2

Michael Fitzpatrick (born 1950) is a libertarian, British general practitioner (GP) and author from London, United Kingdom. He was also a former leader of the Revolutionary Communist Party. Fitzpatrick is known for writing several books and newspaper articles about controversies in autism, from his perspective as someone who is both a GP and the parent of an autistic son. His book Defeating Autism: A Damaging Delusion (2008) describes his views on the rising popularity of "biomedical" treatments for autism, as well as the MMR vaccine controversy.

Fitzpatrick's books have also focused on the pseudoscientific treatments for autism, such as Mark Geier's use of chelation therapy and Lupron as autism treatments, which Fitzpatrick has criticized as "dehumanising and dangerous." He also condemned the use of secretin as an autism treatment in his 2004 book MMR and Autism: What Parents Need to Know, in which he wrote that "the secretin bubble burst" when a randomized controlled trial found that it was ineffective. In an interview with The Guardian, he proposed that special diets are appealing to parents of children with autism because so little is known about the cause or possible treatments for autism, "And then someone else comes along and says your doctor's useless, that they know what caused it, and that you can do something about it".

Fitzpatrick has criticized the 2015 Steve Silberman book NeuroTribes, in part, for advocating for a social model of disability over a medical one, disparaging genetic and neuroscientific autism research, and over-generalizing the needs and abilities of autistic people. He also was skeptical of the authorship of Naoki Higashida, a non-speaking autistic individual, of the book The Reason I Jump because of the "scant explanation" of the process Higashida's mother used for helping him write using the character grid and expressed concern that the book "reinforces more myths than it challenges".

== Books and chapters ==
- The Truth about the AIDS Panic (1987) co-authored with Don Milligan. Junius Publications. ISBN 094839207X
- The Tyranny of Health (2001). Routledge. ISBN 9780415235723
- MMR and Autism: What Parents Need to Know (2004). Routledge. ISBN 9781134355914
- Defeating Autism: A Damaging Delusion (2009). Routledge. doi:10.1093/ije/dyp242
- "The point is to change it: a short account of the Revolutionary Communist Party", in Waiting For The Revolution: the British Far Left from 1956, edited by Evan Smith and Matthew Worley (2017), pp. 218–237. Manchester University Press. ISBN 9781526113665
- Interviewed in Preparing for Power, The Revolutionary Communist Party and its Curious Afterlives, 1976-2020, by Jack Hepworth (2023), Bloomsbury. ISBN 9781350242388
