= Naoki Higashida =

Japanese writer (born 1992)

Naoki Higashida (東田 直樹, Higashida Naoki; born August 12, 1992) is an autistic Japanese writer. His best known work, the memoir The Reason I Jump, written when he was thirteen, has been translated into over 30 languages and was adapted for both stage and screen. The Economist has described him as "probably the most widely read Japanese author after Haruki Murakami".

Higashida's autism is "labelled severe and non-verbal," though he can vocalize in limited contexts. He communicates by pointing to letters on an alphabet grid and sounding them out, with a transcriber writing down what he spells, and also by typing on a computer. He has published more than twenty books in Japan since 2004, including fiction, essays, poetry, and autobiographical works about his experience of autism.

Some researchers have questioned the authenticity of Higashida's writing, noting that his earlier communication methods involved physical contact with a facilitator, characteristic of facilitated communication, which has been discredited and is widely rejected by the scientific community. His authorship has not been independently validated through controlled testing. Temple Grandin, while ultimately accepting his authorship of The Reason I Jump, wrote that there should have been more documentation of his ability to communicate independently.

== Early life ==
Higashida was born on August 12, 1992, in Kimitsu, Japan. He lives in Chiba Prefecture outside Tokyo with his parents and sister, who is a year and a half older than him. Higashida was diagnosed with autism when he was five years old. He became aware of his disability in kindergarten, when he saw that he had difficulty doing things that seemed to come easily to the other children.

Higashida's mother says that he had an interest in words as a child and "would memorise the words he saw on signs and products, and write them on magnetic drawing boards or in the air." He attended a local primary school until fifth grade and then moved to a school for students with special needs, where he found that he was not alone in being neuroatypical, and that the students and teachers were kinder. Naoki Tsuzaka, who interviewed Higashida for The Asahi Shimbun, says "Higashida's mother noticed his power of expression and encouraged him to write poems and short stories." At ages 11 and 12, Higashida won first prize in a Japanese writing competition, the Grimm Fairy Tales Contest.

He had anticipated that he would attend a high school for students with special needs and then go to a work center for those with disabilities. Instead, he "began to aspire to being a writer", and decided to complete high school via correspondence, graduating from Atmark Cosmopolitan High School in 2011.

His mother said that when he was younger, she would compare him to others and "tried to force him to be normal", but now she is "happy to see him find his own world (in writing)" and can just think of him as himself, without comparing him to anyone else.

=== Communication ===
Higashida is generally unable to have spoken conversations, though he can sometimes exchange a few words. Describing this challenge, he says "when I try to speak, the words that come to mind disappear". However, he can sing; can repeat back what someone else has said to him (known as echolalia); can sound out words when using his alphabet grid; and can sometimes read aloud, though this is more difficult for him, as he gets lost. He can also say a few commonly used words and phrases, such as "itadakimasu" (said before a meal to express gratitude), although he sometimes says a different word or phrase than the one he intended to say. Researchers Deborah Fein and Yoko Kamio say "when Naoki does speak, although the content is limited, his articulation and fluency are almost unimpaired", but also that he has "atypical prosody". Prosody refers to elements of speech such as speed and intonation.

Higashida started to communicate via what he calls "hand-supported writing" or "letter-tracing" and then moved to using a letter board. He explains "The first—the hand-supported writing—involves writing on paper with a pen while an assistant is lightly cupping the back of the writer's hand to help keep him or her on task. Letter-tracing is not dissimilar, but here I trace the letters onto the open palm of a transcriber rather than onto paper. These days I use the alphabet-grid method—without anyone's help and without any physical contact—to express my thoughts and feelings." The "hand-supported writing" and "letter-tracing" methods involve physical contact between the communicator and an assistant, which is characteristic of facilitated communication, a method widely rejected by the scientific community. He says that it took him a long time before he could write independently, and he credits the efforts of his mother and Ms. Suzuki, a teacher at the Hagukumi School, a juku focused on supporting students with disabilities. His autism can still make it difficult for him to communicate, for example, when he is interrupted by the need to pace or look out the window. Author David Mitchell says "I've watched Naoki produce a complex sentence within 60 seconds, but I've also seen him take 20 minutes to complete a line of just a few words."

His cardboard alphabet board has a QWERTY layout, as well as the words "yes", "no", and "finished". Higashida says "I point to individual letters and 'voice' the letters as I touch them. I can also type on a computer keyboard, but I get stuck on or obsessed about certain letters. Or sometimes I'll type a word over and over." His computer keyboard also uses a QWERTY layout. He prefers to use Roman letters because there are many fewer characters than in the hiragana syllabary, so using Roman letters makes it easier for him to find the character he is looking for. He generally uses the alphabet board to converse with people and the computer for writing. Typing is harder for him than using the alphabet board, as it involves starting with Roman letters and then extra steps to get to the Japanese kanji, and those steps can be distracting. When he uses his alphabet board to write, as he did with The Reason I Jump, a transcriber writes down what he sounds out.

== Career ==
Since 2004, Higashida has published more than twenty books of fiction and non-fiction in Japan. The Reason I Jump was written when Higashida was 13, and published in Japan in 2007. The book features 58 often-asked questions about his autism, and his answers. It grew out of questions that his mother would ask him as she tried to understand some of his behavior and what made him happy. The book was a success in Japan, and in 2013, it was translated into English by the author David Mitchell and his wife, KA Yoshida. The translation rose to the top of Amazon's United States and British best-seller lists, and was also on The New York Times and The Sunday Times best-seller lists. As of 2017, it had been translated into 34 other languages. Over one million copies have sold worldwide, and it was later adapted into a play and a film. Mitchell says that the book is sometimes used for teacher training with special education teachers. He has also spoken of the book's impact on him personally, calling it a "revelatory godsend". He found it helpful in two main ways: it provided some specific advice and information, and it shifted his attitude to one of treating his own severely autistic son-who, like Higashida, is unable to have conversations-as someone with "intelligence and imagination". This created a "virtuous spiral" in his son's and his own behavior.

In 2017, Yoshida and Mitchell translated another of Higashida's books, Fall Down 7 Times Get Up 8, which covers some of the same territory as The Reason I Jump, but from the perspective of a young adult, and also includes a short story and an interview The Big Issue Japan magazine conducted with Higashida. The book's title refers to a Japanese proverb about perseverance.

In addition to autobiographical works like The Reason I Jump and Fall Down 7 Times Get Up 8, Higashida has published picture books, other children's books, fables, essays, and poems. The Economist states that he is "probably the most widely read Japanese author after Haruki Murakami", and Mitchell thinks that Murakami is the only Japanese author whose work has been translated into more languages. Forbes Japan chose him as one of their "30 under 30" in 2021.

Higashida also blogs and gives presentations in Japan, advocating for autistic people. In his presentations, he reads aloud text that was prepared in advance and then answers questions by typing.

Higashida appeared in the 2011 documentary Wretches & Jabberers, and was featured in two programs produced by Japanese public broadcasting: What You Taught Me About My Son (2014), and What You Taught Me About Happiness (2017). What You Taught Me About My Son was awarded the Prix Italia SIGNIS Special Prize in 2015.

=== Disputed authorship ===
In a 2014 commentary in the Journal of Developmental & Behavioral Pediatrics, researchers Deborah Fein and Yoko Kamio questioned whether Higashida is truly the author of The Reason I Jump. Reviewing video of Higashida, they observed that his mother was usually touching his shoulder, back, or leg, and might be cuing him. They noted that while it would be "extremely easy to provide assurance that Naoki has the capacity to write prose of this level of sophistication," no such testing had been carried out, and concluded that there was "sufficient reason to doubt that Naoki is in fact the independent creator of the book's eloquent prose." Fein and Kamio also warned of the dangers of presenting facilitated communication as effective, noting the potential for harm to children and families.

Scott Lilienfeld et al. said "there is at present no scientific documentation of Higashida's achievements." Katharine Beals said she knows of no evidence that Higashida can "communicate without a facilitator within cueing range". William Simmons, Janyce Boynton, and Todd Landman doubt that Higashida wrote any of the books attributed to him, and argue that if someone else is the actual author, it is a human rights concern to claim that Higashida authored these works, giving him no control over what is attributed to him.

Temple Grandin, an autistic inventor and author, was initially concerned that The Reason I Jump might have been written using facilitated communication, noting that "when this method is used, the facilitator is often the true author", but after reading the book, she says she became "confident" that it was Higashida's own work. However, Grandin wrote that there should have been more documentation on his ability to communicate independently.

Author David Mitchell, who translated The Reason I Jump into English, says there are videos of Higashida communicating independently, and that nobody else's hand is near Higashida's during his use of the alphabet board.

== Books ==
- Jihei to iu boku no sekai, 自閉というぼくの世界, 2004 (My World of Autism)
- kono hoshi ni sunde iru boku no nakama tachi e, この地球にすんでいる僕の仲間たちへ, 2005 (To My Colleagues Living on This Planet)
- Yuuki wa oishii hazu, 勇気はおいしいはず, 2005 (Courage Should Be Delicious)
- Minna no shiranai umi no oto, みんなの知らない海の音, 2005 (Sound of the Ocean That Everyone Does Not Know)
- Kiran kiran; Akai mi, きらんきらん・赤い実, 2005 (Kiran Kiran; Red Fruit)
- Kikansha Kansuke, きかんしゃカンスケ, 2006 (Architect Kansuke)
- Kansuke to akai happa, カンスケとあかいはっぱ, 2006 (Kansuke and the Red Leaf)
- Jiheisho no boku ga tobihaneru riyu, 自閉症の僕が跳びはねる理由, 2007 (The Reason I Jump) Translated by KA Yoshida and David Mitchell, 2013
- Kansuke to katatsumuri kun, カンスケとかたつむりくん, 2007 (Kansuke and the Little Snail)
- Kansuke to Yukiko chan, カンスケとゆきこちゃん, 2007 (Kansuke and Yukiko)
- Jiheisho no boku ga nokosite kita kotoba tachi, 自閉症の僕が残してきた言葉たち, 2008 (The Words I Have Left of Autism)
- Hentekorin, ヘンテコリン, 2008 (Strange)
- Kansuke no kurisumasu, カンスケのクリスマス, 2008 (Kansuke's Christmas)
- Zoku jiheisho no boku ga tobihaneru riyu, 続・自閉症の僕が跳びはねる理由, 2010 (The Reason I Jump, part 2)
- Kaze ni naru, 風になる, 2012 (Become the Wind)
- Arugamama ni jiheisho desu, あるがままに自閉症です, 2013 (Autistic As It Is)
- Tobihaneru shiko, 飛びはねる思考, 2014 (Jumping Spirit)
- Arigato wa boku no mimi ni kodama suru, ありがとうは僕の耳にこだまする, 2014 (Thank You, Echoes in My Ears)
- Nanakorobi yaoki, 七転び八起き, 2015 (Fall Down 7 Times Get Up 8) Translated by KA Yoshida and David Mitchell, 2017
