= Loving Lampposts =

2010 documentary about autism and neurodiversity

- Film poster
- Directed by: Todd Drezner
- Release date: May 28, 2010 (DocMiami)
- Running time: 84 minutes
- Country: United States
- Language: English

Loving Lampposts is a 2010 American documentary film directed by Todd Drezner, exploring the neurodiversity movement and the principle of autism acceptance through a series of interviews and candid footage. Drezner is the father of an autistic child whose attachment to and fascination with lampposts gave the film its title.

The film premiered at the 2010 DocMiami International Film Festival.

== Background ==
In Loving Lampposts, Drezner interviews several neurodiversity advocates and autistic activists about their views on autism, including Kassiane Asasumasu, autistic activist and blogger; Dora Raymaker, autistic activist and co-director of the Academic Autistic Spectrum Partnership in Research and Education, originally a project of the Autistic Self Advocacy Network; Phil Schwarz, an autistic activist affiliated with Autism Network International who is also the father of an autistic son; Stephen Shore, a formerly nonspeaking autistic person who is now a professor of special education at Adelphi University; anthropologist Roy Richard Grinker, father of an autistic child; Estée Klar, creator of The Autism Acceptance Project; and English professor and blogger Kristina Chew, mother of an autistic child. Loving Lampposts also features interviews with parents and autism professionals opposed to the neurodiversity movement, who instead support finding treatments or a cure for autism, including Jenny McCarthy and Doreen Granpeesheh. Drezner also interviews Sharisa Joy Kochmeister, a non-verbal autistic individual who is purported to communicate through the scientifically discredited technique of facilitated communication.
