= Autism: The Musical =

- Promotional poster
- Directed by: Tricia Regan
- Written by: Tricia Regan
- Produced by: Tricia Regan; Sasha Alpert; Perrin Chiles
- Starring: Henry Stills; Joseph Rainbow; Wyatt O'Neil; Neal Goldberg; Adam Walden; Cody Massey; Shane Doherty
- Cinematography: Tricia Regan
- Edited by: Kim Roberts
- Music by: Mike Semple
- Production company: Bunim/Murray Productions
- Distributed by: HBO Documentary Films
- Release date: April 18, 2007 (Tribeca Film Festival)
- Running time: 94 minutes
- Language: English

Autism: The Musical is a 2007 American documentary television movie written and directed by Tricia Regan. The film recounts six months in the lives of five autistic children in Los Angeles, California as they write and rehearse for an original stage production.

In April 2007, the film premiered at the Tribeca Film Festival in New York City before airing as a special on HBO in March 2008.

== Synopsis ==
The film recounts six months in the lives of five autistic children and their parents in Los Angeles, California as the children write and rehearse for an original stage production. The children featured in the film have one or more things they excel at doing if only given the training they need to communicate and develop those skills.

Several of the parents appearing in the film are well known in their own right, such as Rosanne Katon and Stephen Stills. They and the other parents round out a cast of real-life parents struggling with their strained marriages while dealing with the sometimes overwhelming needs of their autistic children.

== Production ==
An idea for the film was first raised in July 2005, as a potential 48 Hour Film Project, but did not materialize. However, in that same year, noted acting coach Elaine Hall founded The Miracle Project, a nonprofit, Sherman Oaks, California based theater group for autistic and other disabled children. In late 2005, Tricia Regan began filming the six-month rehearsal process at Vista Del Mar Child and Family Services recreation room in Los Angeles. Regan is said to have collected more than 400 hours of raw material, winnowing the documentary to five complementary family narratives. The title of the film emerged only in the late stages of editing.

In March 2007, reality show producer Bunim/Murray Productions expanded its business into films and made Autism: The Musical its first acquisition. Bunim/Murray Productions came on board toward the end of shooting to join In Effect Films in producing the film.

== Distribution ==
After its premiere on April 18, 2007, at Robert De Niro's sixth annual Tribeca Film Festival, the film enjoyed a limited theatrical run in several US cities in 2007. Among its many awards, the film received the best documentary award at the 10th annual Newport International Film Festival in June 2007. The film was purchased for broadcast beginning March 25, 2008 by HBO.

The film was released on DVD in 2008 by Docurama Films.

== Accolades ==
On November 19, 2007, Autism: The Musical was named by the Academy of Motion Picture Arts and Sciences as one of 15 films on its documentary feature Oscar short list. The film has won awards at 7 major film festivals in the U.S. Following its television broadcast on HBO, the film garnered two 2008 Emmy awards, for nonfiction film editing as well as Primetime Emmy Award for Outstanding Documentary or Nonfiction Special.

== Sequel ==
On April 2, 2020, it was announced that a sequel, titled Autism: The Sequel, would premiere on April 28, 2020.

== See also ==
- List of films about autism
- Autism in popular culture
- Stanley Greenspan – His floortime approach to engage children with autism inspired Elaine Hall to create The Miracle Project, the subject of Autism: The Musical.
