= Autism Every Day =

- Directed by: Lauren Thierry
- Produced by: Eric Solomon; Lauren Thierry
- Cinematography: Francisco Aliwalas; Chris Meagher
- Edited by: Brian Dileo; Christine Dupree
- Music by: APM Music
- Release date: May 9, 2006
- Running time: 13 minutes (2006 debut); 46 minutes (Sundance version)
- Country: United States
- Language: English

Autism Every Day is a controversial 2006 American documentary film sponsored by Autism Speaks, and produced by Lauren Thierry, Jim Watkins and Eric Solomon. It follows mothers of autistic children, and consists mainly of interviews with the mothers.

A 13-minute version of Autism Every Day debuted at a fundraiser named "A New Decade for Autism" in New York City on May 9, 2006, and made its mainstream debut on Don Imus show on MSNBC the following day. It was selected by the Sundance Institute as a special screening film at the 2007 Sundance Film Festival. A 7-minute version of the film was also uploaded to Autism Speaks' YouTube Channel, however as of 2021, the video was marked "Private" due to a change in YouTube policy that automatically marked private all "unlisted" videos dated December 31, 2016 or earlier.

The New York Observer said the film was a

short documentary film ... about the lives of mothers of autistic kids. The film consists mainly of interviews with mothers (and scenes of them with their autistic children), mothers whose lives have been utterly transformed. The situation of these mothers is just unrelieved, unrelenting.

According to Stuart Murray, author of Representing Autism: Culture, Narrative, Fascination, disability rights advocates criticized the film for characterizing the condition as "one of problems and difficulties, especially for parents", while ignoring the positive aspects. Additionally, criticism stemmed from an interview in the film where a mother said she had contemplated driving off a bridge with her autistic daughter.

== Criticism and controversy ==
One interview in the film that drew significant controversy was that of Alison Tepper Singer, who described how she had contemplated driving off a bridge with her autistic daughter Jodie Singer when faced with having to place her in a school for disabled children, saying "It's only because of Lauren, because I have another child, that I didn't do it". Some have drawn a connection between Alison's words in the film and the murder of 3 year old autistic girl Katie McCarron on May 13, 2006, 4 days after the film's debut, by her mother Karen McCarron.

Both the film and Autism Speaks have received heavy condemnation from autistic people and groups advocating for autistics, with complaints about the film including that it portrays autistic people as tragic burdens rather than as actual human beings who happen to be autistic—which most of them do not want to be "cured" of or see it as a bad thing. It is also criticized for the fact that many of these interviews—most of which are about the things the parents can't do and how horrible it is to have a child with autism—are conducted with said child in the room, again without any regard for the fact that their children can hear and understand the parents talking about how horrible it is to have to take care of them. This is especially focused on with the aforementioned case of Alison Singer, who spoke about contemplating murder-suicide with her daughter Jodie in the room.

One of the producers, Lauren Thierry, said that these feelings were not unusual among non-autistic mothers of autistic children. According to the book Battleground: The Media, Thierry instructed the families she interviewed not to do their hair, vacuum or have therapists present, and appeared with her film crew at homes without preliminary preparations, in order to authentically capture the difficulties of life with autistic children, such as autistic children experiencing meltdowns or physically struggling with parents.

In 2009, Singer responded by claiming that she made this comment because the New York State Department of Health recommended that her autistic daughter be placed in a school with very poor conditions, and did not want her daughter to suffer there. However, she deeply regretted phrasing her concerns in that manner.

== See also ==
- List of films about autism
- Autism in popular culture
