= The Transporters =

2006 children's television series

- Genre: Animation; Children's
- Created by: Simon Baron Cohen
- Written by: Julie Middleton; Steve Middleton
- Narrated by: Stephen Fry (UK); Kerry Shale (US)
- Music by: Richard G. Mitchell
- Country of origin: United Kingdom
- Original language: English
- No. of episodes: 15

Production
- Running time: 5 minutes per episode
- Production company: Catalyst Pictures Ltd.

Original release
- Release: 2006

The Transporters is a 2006 children's animation DVD series produced by Catalyst Pictures Limited designed to help children with autism aged between two and eight years old to recognise and understand emotions.

It was developed by the Autism Research Centre at the University of Cambridge by a team led by Professor Simon Baron-Cohen and including Dr. Ofer Golan.

The Transporters is based on the idea that children with autism may find human faces confusing since they are unpredictable due to the fact that the autistic brains cannot cope with unpredictability. In Baron-Cohen's theory, children with autism are strong "systemisers" and faces are hard to systemise. In contrast, children with autism have a preference for predictable systems. Therefore, The Transporters focuses on mechanical vehicles that only move along fixed tracks, as they are highly predictable systems. Grafted onto these animated scale model vehicles are real human faces, so that social skills teaching takes place in an autism friendly format.

== Evaluation ==
A study published in the Journal of Autism and Developmental Disorders found that after watching the DVD for 15 minutes a day for four weeks, most children with ASC (autistic spectrum condition) caught up with typically developing children in their ability to recognise emotions on four different tasks

Later replications of the study found similar results cross-culturally.

== The series ==
The Transporters DVD release(s) consists of 15 five-minute episodes, each featuring a key emotion. There are also 30 interactive quizzes and an accompanying booklet to reinforce learning. In 2007, the series was nominated for a BAFTA award.

The series features eight animated scale model vehicles owned by a boy called Jamie. Each of them has an actual human face so that viewers learn to recognise real rather than cartoon expressions. All the expressions were verified by an independent panel before they were included in the series.

There are two versions of the DVD, with different accents and vocabulary. The North American version is voiced by Kerry Shale and the British English version is voiced by Stephen Fry.

The Transporters was originally commissioned by Culture Online, which was part of the UK government’s Department for Culture, Media and Sport.

== Characters ==
- Barney the Tractor
- Charlie the Tram
- Dan the Cable Car
- Jennie the Tram
- Nigel the Coach
- Oliver the Funicular
- Sally the Cable Car
- William the Ferry

== Episodes with key emotions ==
1. "The Transporters' Happy Day"
2. "Sally's Sad Day"
3. "Nigel's Slow Day"
4. "Charlie Saves the Day"
5. "A Very Exciting Day"
6. "Jennie's Smelly Adventure"
7. "Barney's Special Day"
8. "William's Scrapyard Nightmare"
9. "Charlie's Missed School Run"
10. "Oliver the Kind Funicular"
11. "Slow Down, Nigel!"
12. "The Great Race"
13. "Why Can't I Be Somebody Else?"
14. "Playing Around"
15. "Jennie's Difficult Day"

== Voice cast ==
- Stephen Fry as the Narrator (UK)
- Kerry Shale as the Narrator (USA)

== See also ==
- The Space Place
- Normal People Scare Me
- Laxey Wheel
