= The Reason I Jump =

2007 biography book by Naoki Higashida

- Cover of the book
- Author: Naoki Higashida
- Translator: Keiko Yoshida, David Mitchell
- Language: Japanese, English
- Publisher: Random House
- Publication date: 2007
- English publication date: 2013
- Pages: 135
- ISBN: 978-0-812-99486-5
- Followed by: Fall Down 7 Times Get Up 8

The Reason I Jump: One Boy's Voice from the Silence of Autism (Japanese: 自閉症の僕が跳びはねる理由～会話のできない中学生がつづる内なる心～, Hepburn: Jiheishō no Boku ga Tobihaneru Riyū ~Kaiwa no Dekinai Chūgakusei ga Tsuzuru Uchinaru Kokoro~) is an autobiography by Naoki Higashida, a nonverbal autistic person from Japan. Written when he was 13, the book was first published in Japan in 2007. English translation, by Keiko Yoshida and her husband, the English author David Mitchell, was published in 2013, with an introduction by the translators.

The book states that its author, Higashida, learned to communicate using an alphabet grid. There has been some controversy over his authorship.

The book became a New York Times bestseller and a Sunday Times bestseller for hardback nonfiction in the UK. It has been translated into over 30 other languages, and inspired a play from the National Theatre of Scotland and a feature documentary.

== Background ==
Higashida was diagnosed with autism when he was five years old, and has limited verbal communication skills. With help from his mother, he is purported to have written the book using a method he once described as "facilitated finger writing". This bears some resemblance to facilitated communication, a method which has been discredited as pseudoscience by organizations including the American Academy of Pediatrics and the American Psychological Association, but Higashida is known to communicate with no physical support. Some researchers have questioned the authenticity of Higashida's writings, while others have studied them with interest.

== Synopsis ==
The majority of the memoir is told through 58 questions Higashida and many other people dealing with autism are commonly asked, along with his answers. Interspersed are sections of short prose. These sections are either memories Higashida shares or parabolic stories that relate to the themes discussed throughout the memoir. The collection ends with Higashida's short story, "I'm Right Here", which the author prefaces by saying:

I wrote this story in the hope that it will help you to understand how painful it is when you can't express yourself to the people you love. If this story connects with your heart in some way, then I believe you'll be able to connect back to the hearts of people with autism too.

== Translation ==
The English author David Mitchell and his wife, Keiko Yoshida, have a severely autistic son. They searched for books that might provide some "practical insight" to help them, saying that they had found academic texts and memoirs by adults with autism or by their family members, "but few were of much 'hands-on' help with our non-verbal, regularly distressed five-year-old". Yoshida, who is Japanese, ordered a copy of The Reason I Jump, which at the time was only available in Japanese. Initially, she translated parts of the book out loud for Mitchell at the kitchen table, and then they translated the book informally to give to their son's teachers and caregivers. Mitchell's agent and editor thought the book might have a wider audience. After receiving permission from Higashida, they created an English translation for publication.

Mitchell says the book was "a revelatory godsend" for him, providing both practical advice and leading him to think of their son having greater agency than he had previously thought, which helped their son. He found it helpful in two main ways: it provided some specific advice and information, and it shifted his attitude to one of treating his son—who, like Higashida, is unable to have conversations—as someone with "intelligence and imagination". This created a "virtuous spiral" in his son's and his own behavior. The book was subsequently translated into 34 other languages.

== Reception ==
Writing for The Times, author Andrew Solomon described the book as "a Rosetta Stone for parents" of non-verbal autistic children, at times banal and occasionally profound, and says "it will stretch your vision of what it is to be human". He adds that "sometimes, it sounds as though it were the work of a prudent adult pretending to be a 13-year-old boy, because the freshness of voice coexists with so much wisdom". Reviewing several books about autism for The Boston Globe, Katharine Whittemore describes them as "extraordinary, moving, and jeweled with epiphanies", and says The Reason I Jump bowled her over. In her Publishers Weekly review, Clare Swanson writes of Higashida's "candid, emotionally honest answers" that help to demystify behavior and that his "thoughtful, sensitive reasoning delivers illuminating insights". More than one reviewer commented on the painstaking work of using an alphabet grid to write the book.

Sallie Tisdale, writing for The New York Times, said Higashida is intelligent and thoughtful, but also raises a concern that others are treating it "more as a fragile objet de consciousness than as a book, as though criticism or analysis would be vulgar". She objects to Higashida's use of "we" and "our", when he can only speak for himself, and wonders how much the work was changed in translation, especially by Mitchell. She concludes, "We have to be careful about turning what we find into what we want." Researcher Yoko Kamio, who reads both English and Japanese, writes "The English translation eliminates some redundancies in the Japanese and is a bit more concise but is generally an accurate translation."

The book was on several lists of the best books of the year, including Barnes & Noble,Bloomberg Business News, The London Evening Standard, NPR, and The Observer.

The autism advocacy organization Autism Speaks also praised the book and conducted an interview with Mitchell.

The book has also received attention from researchers, many of whom dispute Higashida's authorship. Writing in the Journal of Developmental and Behavioral Pediatrics Fein and Kamio have raised concerns about the authenticity of Higashida's communication methods, suggesting that his mother may be providing cues, as seen in a video, or that he might be independently typing previously memorized text. They further said that he appeared to be providing previously memorized, general answers, such as "Why do you ask me? I think this. But everyone has an answer. You should ask your child." Similar concerns have been raised by other researchers. In Human Rights Quarterly, Simmons, Boynton, and Landman wrote that Higashida "likely did not author the New York Times bestseller or any of the fourteen other books that were attributed to him by the age of twenty", raising human rights concerns about the use of facilitated communication, which is widely regarded as pseudoscience. Psychologist Jens Hellmann said that the accounts in the book "resemble what I would deem very close to an autistic child's parents' dream". Michael Fitzpatrick, a physician and father of an autistic child, also criticized the book and its film, expressing doubts about the communication systems used and saying it is a "myth" that "within the autistic individual a fully competent person is imprisoned, requiring the liberation offered by a quasi-magical technology".

== Adaptations ==
The book was adapted into a play in 2018, put on by the National Theatre of Scotland. It featured an outdoor maze designed by the Dutch collective Observatorium, and each of several autistic performers told "an intensely individual tale" as the audience moved through the maze. The play was very well-received, with reviewer Joyce McMillan saying "it is, in its quiet way, as unforgettable and life-enhancing a show as I can recall seeing". The following year, an augmented reality app was developed that enabled visitors to the outdoor location to experience some of the play as they moved through the maze, which remained.

The book was also adapted into a feature-length documentary, directed by Jerry Rothwell. It was presented at the 2020 Sundance Film Festival, where it won the Audience Award for World Cinema – Documentary. Among its other awards are the Maysles Brothers Award for Best Documentary at the 2020 Denver Film Festival, the Impact Award at the 2020 Vancouver International Film Festival, the Best Foreign Film Award at the 2020 Rome International Film Festival, and Best Documentary at the 2021 British Independent Film Awards.

The documentary received positive reviews from critics. Screen Daily's Fionnula Halligan stated "The Reason I Jump will change how you think, and how many films can say that?", while Leslie Fleperin of Hollywood Reporter said that the documentary was "a work of cinematic alchemy", and Guy Lodge of Variety commended the film for turning the original book into "an inventive, sensuous documentary worthy of its source." On 3 June 2020, Kino Lorber acquired The Reason I Jump to film in the United States. The film screened at the 2020 AFI Docs film festival.

== Fall Down 7 Times Get Up 8 ==

Fall Down 7 Times Get Up 8: A Young Man's Voice from the Silence of Autism is a follow-up to The Reason I Jump, written in 2015 and credited to Higashida when he was between the ages of 18 and 22. Higashida has autism and his verbal communication skills are limited, but is said to be able to communicate by pointing at letters on an alphabet chart.

The book is a collection of short chapters arranged in eight sections in which Higashida explores identity, family relationships, education, society, and his personal growth. The title comes from a Japanese proverb, 七転び八起き, which literally translates as "Fall seven times and stand up eight". The English translation by Mitchell and Yoshida was released on 11 July 2017.

Skeptics have claimed that there is no proof that Higashida can communicate independently, and that the English translation represents the ideals of Mitchell and Yoshida. In response, Mitchell said there is video evidence showing that Higashida can type independently.

== See also ==
Films

- Annie's Coming Out
- Autism Is a World
- Deej
- Wretches & Jabberers
