= The Miracle Project =

Theater and film program for autistic children

The Miracle Project is a theater and film program for autistic children and their siblings and friends, which was featured in the HBO documentary Autism: The Musical. The documentary premiered at the Tribeca Film Festival, and won two Emmy Awards and many Audience Awards.

== History ==
The program, founded by Elaine Hall, is a grantee of the Annenberg Institute. Elaine's adopted son Neal is autistic, and she has published Now I See the Moon about her life as his mother. Together with Miracle Project collaborator Diane Isaacs, Elaine also produced a DVD series entitled 7 Keys to Unlocking the World of Autism. Elaine has been featured in The Autism Perspective magazine, and has received the Angel Award from the Malibu Special Education Foundation, the Kinus Award for Outstanding Achievement (in Canada) and the Miracle Worker Award from Autism Speaks.

== Recordings ==
The Miracle Project also produced a CD entitled Fly...Into the World of Autism, featuring music written by children in the project and performed by Jack Black, Macy Gray, Jason Alexander, Stephen Stills, and other celebrities.

== The Miracle Project at Sea ==
The Miracle Project linked up with Autism on the Seas who assists families cruising with individuals with special needs. Together, the Miracle Project worked side by side with this group of individuals to put together a performance (comedy/music) to be performed in front of an audience on board Royal Caribbean's Freedom of the Seas. Practices were held daily where the individuals learned songs, parts, created instruments, and interacted with one another to put together a performance.
