= Ready Eddie Go! =

2023 television series

- Genre: Children's television
- Created by: Nikki Saunders and James Murphy
- Based on: My Awesome Autism by Nikki Saunders
- Directed by: Justin Lowings
- Voices of: Jodie Whittaker; Grayson Davies; Sanna Kurihara; Imran Shebani; Juha Kizilbas
- Composers: Jim Cornick; Matt Loveridge
- Country of origin: United Kingdom
- Original language: English
- No. of series: 2
- No. of episodes: 52

Production
- Executive producers: Nikki Saunders; James Murphy
- Producer: Miles Paulley
- Running time: Approx. 7 minutes
- Production company: Hocus Pocus Studio

Original release
- Network: Sky Kids
- Release: 15 September 2023 – 15 April 2025

Ready Eddie Go! is a British children's television series produced by Hocus Pocus Studio that premiered on Sky Kids on 15 September 2023 (and broadcast on the linear Sky Kids channel, from 18 September 2023). It was created by James Murphy and Nikki Saunders, based on her book series My Awesome Autism. The series follows the adventures of Eddie, a six year old autistic boy. The series is narrated by Jodie Whittaker. It ended on 2 July 2025, after 2 series.

The programme was renewed for a second series, which aired in June 2025.

The series was nominated for BAFTA in 2025 in the Children's Scripted category.

The website will be removed from all web browsers on November 25, 2026.

== Premise ==
Eddie (Grayson) is a fun-loving six year old autistic boy (inspired by Saunders' own son) who navigates everyday challenges and how to overcome them, with the help of his friends and family.

== Cast ==
- Jodie Whittaker as The Narrator
- Grayson Davies as Eddie
- Sanna Kurihara as Nina
- Imran Shebani as Akil

== Production ==
The series features several actors who are neurodivergent such as Davies, as well as writers and animators.

== Episodes ==
=== Series 1 ===
No.	Title	Written by	Original release date
1	"Birthday Party"	Joseph Morpurgo (lead writer) Helen Simmons Joe Bennett	15 September 2023 (On Demand); 18 September 2023 (Broadcast)
Eddie is invited to Nina's birthday party, but what will he do there?
2	"Painting"	Joseph Morpurgo (lead writer) Helen Simmons Joe Bennett	15 September 2023 (On Demand)
At school, Eddie has an art class where he must learn how to turn a mistake into art.
3	"Board Games"	Joseph Morpurgo (lead writer) Helen Simmons Joe Bennett	15 September 2023 (On Demand)
A board game with friends proves to be a challenge for Eddie and his sensitivities.
4	"A Visit from Grandpa"	Joseph Morpurgo (lead writer) Helen Simmons Joe Bennett	15 September 2023 (On Demand)
Eddie's grandpa is coming by, but how will Eddie get ready?
5	"Dressing Up"	Joseph Morpurgo (lead writer) Helen Simmons Joe Bennett	15 September 2023 (On Demand)
Eddie's friends decide to come up with a costume for him, so he can play.
6	"The Cinema"	Joseph Morpurgo (lead writer) Helen Simmons Joe Bennett	15 September 2023 (On Demand)
Will the noise of the cinema prove too much for Eddie to enjoy the movie?
7	"Washing Hair"	Joseph Morpurgo (lead writer) Helen Simmons Joe Bennett	15 September 2023 (On Demand)
Bathtime may be tricky for Eddie, so can his thinking tricks help?
8	"The Dentist"	Joseph Morpurgo (lead writer) Helen Simmons Joe Bennett	15 September 2023 (On Demand)
A visit to the dentist is daunting for Eddie, so he learns more about it.
9	"Trying New Foods"	Joseph Morpurgo (lead writer) Helen Simmons Joe Bennett	15 September 2023 (On Demand)
Broccoli proves to be a strange conundrum for Eddie, but will he be willing to try it?
10	"Eddie's Haircut"	Joseph Morpurgo (lead writer) Helen Simmons Joe Bennett	15 September 2023 (On Demand)
It's Eddie's first haircut and he discovers that the sensory experiences at the hairdressers can be fun.
11	"Musical Instruments"	Joseph Morpurgo (lead writer) Helen Simmons Joe Bennett	15 September 2023 (On Demand)
Eddie, Akil and Nina are exploring some musical instruments and Eddie learns about the xylophone.
12	"The Train"	Joseph Morpurgo Helen Simmons Joe Bennett	15 September 2023 (On Demand)
Eddie is taking a train to Grandpa's house. How exciting!
13	"The Supermarket"	Joseph Morpurgo (lead writer) Helen Simmons Joe Bennett	15 September 2023 (On Demand)
Eddie and his mum are getting some ingredients for a chocolate cake at the supermarket.
14	"Growing Sunflowers"	Joseph Morpurgo (lead writer) Helen Simmons Joe Bennett	15 September 2023 (On Demand)
Eddie is growing sunflowers at the gardening club at his school.
15	"The Sleepover"	Joseph Morpurgo (lead writer) Helen Simmons Joe Bennett	15 September 2023 (On Demand)
Eddie is going to his first sleepover at Nina's house.
16	"The Seaside"	Joseph Morpurgo (lead writer) Helen Simmons Joe Bennett	15 September 2023 (On Demand)
Eddie learns to deal with scratchy sand, build up sandcastle and preserve the environment at the seaside.
17	"Time Capsule"	Joseph Morpurgo (lead writer) Helen Simmons Joe Bennett	15 September 2023 (On Demand)
Eddie makes a time capsule by collecting items that are important to him.
18	"Eddie's Morning Routine"	Joseph Morpurgo (lead writer) Helen Simmons Joe Bennett	15 September 2023 (On Demand)
It's time for Eddie to do his morning routine.
19	"The Doctor"	Joseph Morpurgo (lead writer) Helen Simmons Joe Bennett	15 September 2023 (On Demand)
Eddie visits the doctor because he's unwell.
20	"Making Pancakes"	Joseph Morpurgo (lead writer) Helen Simmons Joe Bennett	15 September 2023 (On Demand)
Eddie makes pancakes with his mum.
21	"Building a Den"	Joseph Morpurgo (lead writer) Helen Simmons Joe Bennett	15 September 2023 (On Demand)
Eddie and his friends are building a den in the woods.
22	"Fireworks"	Joseph Morpurgo (lead writer) Helen Simmons Joe Bennett	15 September 2023 (On Demand)
Eddie watches the fireworks at Nina's house. What fun!
23	"Halloween"	Joseph Morpurgo (lead writer) Helen Simmons Joe Bennett	15 September 2023 (On Demand)
It's Halloween and Eddie is going trick or treating with his mum, his dog Scout and his friends.
24	"Cheering Up Your Friend"	Joseph Morpurgo (lead writer) Helen Simmons Joe Bennett	15 September 2023 (On Demand)
Nina has hurt her arm. Can Eddie and Akil work together to cheer her up?
25	"Easter Egg Hunt"	Joseph Morpurgo (lead writer) Helen Simmons Joe Bennett	15 September 2023 (On Demand)
It's Easter time and Eddie and his friends are going on an Easter Egg hunt.
26	"The Class Pet"	Joseph Morpurgo (lead writer) Helen Simmons Joe Bennett	15 September 2023 (On Demand)
Eddie is looking after a class pet for the weekend.

=== Series 2 ===
No.	Title	Written by	Original release date
1	"Toilet Time"	Joseph Morpurgo (lead writer) Helen Simmons Joe Bennett Zahara Andrews	15 April 2025 (On Demand); 18 September 2023 (Broadcast)
Eddie visits the Space Museum but needs to use an unfamiliar toilet. With Dad's help, he overcomes his worries and enjoys the rest of his day out.
2	"Trampoline Park"	Joseph Morpurgo (lead writer) Helen Simmons Joe Bennett Zahara Andrews	15 April 2025 (On Demand)
Eddie visits a trampoline park for the first time. After putting on special socks, he discovers the joy of bouncing, making shapes, and jumping into the foam pit.
3	"Picnic"	Joseph Morpurgo (lead writer) Helen Simmons Joe Bennett Zahara Ansrews	15 April 2025 (On Demand)
Eddie, his family, Akil and Granny go to the park for a picnic. They find the perfect spot to enjoy their food, even when a surprise rain shower arrives.
4	"Headlice"	Joseph Morpurgo (lead writer) Helen Simmons Joe Bennett Zahara Andrews	15 April 2025 (On Demand)
Eddie discovers he has itchy headlice and learns what they are from Nina and Akil. With patient combing, he finds that dealing with them isn't scary after all.
5	"New Classmate"	Joseph Morpurgo (lead writer) Helen Simmons Joe Bennett Zahara Andrews	15 April 2025 (On Demand)
When Frieda joins Eddie’s class, he feels nervous about the changes. Eddie learns to welcome her with kindness and discovers that new friends can be great fun.
6	"Stargazing"	Joseph Morpurgo (lead writer) Helen Simmons Joe Bennett Zahara Andres	15 April 2025 (On Demand)
Eddie shares his love of astronomy with Akil during an evening of stargazing. Together, they spot constellations and planets, and Eddie learns to share his special interest.
7	"Library"	Joseph Morpurgo (lead writer) Helen Simmons Joe Bennett Zahara Andrews	15 April 2025 (On Demand)
Eddie must return his beloved Mars Rover book to the library. Dad helps him find an exciting new book about UFOs to borrow and enjoy at home.
8	"Swimming"	Joseph Morpurgo (lead writer) Helen Simmons Joe Bennett Zahara Andrews	15 April 2025 (On Demand)
Eddie proudly shows his swimming badges but still keeps his head above water. With Dad's help at the pool, he overcomes his fear and earns a new badge.
9	"Breaktime"	Joseph Morpurgo (lead writer) Helen Simmons Joe Bennett Zahara Andrews	15 April 2025 (On Demand)
Eddie finds school breaktime overwhelming with so much to choose from. He starts with familiar building blocks before joining in a fun game of tag.
10	"Posting a letter"	Joseph Morpurgo (lead writer) Helen Simmons Joe Bennett Zahara Andrews	15 April 2025 (On Demand)
Eddie writes and posts a letter to Grandad. With Dad’s help, he draws pictures, writes about his week, and carefully posts it in the letterbox.
11	"Opticians"	Joseph Morpurgo (lead writer) Helen Simmons Joe Bennett Zahara Andrews	15 April 2025 (On Demand)
Eddie visits the optician for an eye test filled with fun activities. Though he’s disappointed not to need glasses like Nina, he happily wears his sunglasses instead.
12	"Camping"	Joseph Morpurgo (lead writer)Helen Simmons Joe Bennett Zahara Andrews	15 April 2025 (On Demand)
Eddie visits the optician for an eye test filled with fun activities. Though he’s disappointed not to need glasses like Nina, he happily wears his sunglasses instead.
13	"Show & Tell"	Joseph Morpurgo (lead writer) Helen Simmons Joe Bennett Zahara Andrews	15 April 2025 (On Demand)
Eddie prepares and delivers a talk about his space helmet during Show and Tell, sharing five fun facts and overcoming his nerves.
14	"Shoe Shopping"	Joseph Morpurgo (lead writer) Helen Simmons Joe Bennett Zahara Andrews	15 April 2025 (On Demand)
Eddie goes to the shoe shop with his mum
15	"Building a Snowman"	Joseph Morpurgo (lead writer) Helen Simmons Joe Bennett Zahara Andrews	15 April 2025 (On Demand)
Eddie and Dad spend a snowy day building “Chilly-am” the snowman. Eddie learns that even when snowmen melt, happy memories stay
16	"Restaurant"	Joseph Morpurgo (lead writer) Helen Simmons Joe Bennett Zahara Andrews	15 April 2025 (On Demand)
Eddie goes to an Italian restaurant for Dad’s birthday. Despite the noise and waiting, he uses his ear defenders and enjoys a delicious cheese pizza.
17	"Parents Going Away"	Joseph Morpurgo (lead writer) Helen Simmons Joe Bennett Zahara Andrews	15 April 2025 (On Demand)
Mum and Dad go away for the night and Grandpa stays over. Although Eddie feels anxious, they have fun making pizza and doing jigsaws together
18	"Cake Sale"	Joseph Morpurgo (lead writer) Helen Simmons Joe Bennett Zahara Andrews	15 April 2025 (On Demand)
Eddie helps Nina and Akil to run the school's cake sale
19	"Litter Pick"	Joseph Morpurgo (lead writer) Helen Simmons Joe Bennett Zahara Andrews	15 April 2025 (On Demand)
Eddie joins a community litter pick at the park with Nina and Akil. He helps collect rubbish with a grabber and learns how teamwork helps care for the environment
20	"Meeting a Baby"	Joseph Morpurgo (lead writer) Helen Simmons Joe Bennett Zahara Andrews	15 April 2025 (On Demand)
Eddie helps look after his baby cousin Toby. He discovers that feeding, playing with, and soothing a baby is harder than it looks!
21	"Fire Alarm Test"	Joseph Morpurgo (lead writer) Helen Simmons Joe Bennett Zahara Andrews	15 April 2025 (On Demand)
Eddie prepares for a fire alarm test at school. With his ear defenders and learning the routine, he manages the loud noise bravely.
22	"Riding a Bike"	Joseph Morpurgo (lead writer) Helen Simmons Joe Bennett Zahara Andrews	15 April 2025 (On Demand)
Eddie learns to ride his bike. With lots of wobbling and help from his family and Scout, he gains confidence and pedals away happily
23	"Lost & Found"	Joseph Morpurgo (lead writer) Helen Simmons Joe Bennett Zahara Andrews	15 April 2025 (On Demand)
Eddie and Nina search the house for Eddie’s missing space shuttle toy, Discovery. After lots of searching, Scout finds it hiding under a rug.
24	"Hide & Seek"	Joseph Morpurgo (lead writer) Helen Simmons Joe Bennett Zahara Andrews	15 April 2025 (On Demand)
Grandpa teaches Eddie how to play Hide and Seek. After practising in the garden, Eddie joins a fun game with his friends at school
25	"Wobbly Tooth"	Joseph Morpurgo (lead writer) Helen Simmons Joe Bennett Zahara Andrews	15 April 2025 (On Demand)
Eddie has his first wobbly tooth. He learns about baby teeth and looks forward to a visit from the tooth fairy.
26	"Ready, Eddie, Christmas!"	Joseph Morpurgo (lead writer) Helen Simmons Joe Bennett Zahara Andrews	15 December 2024 (On Demand)
Eddie enjoys Christmas, making decorations and taking quiet breaks.

== See also ==
- Pablo, a CBeebies series also about a small autistic boy, performed and written by autistic people.
