= Neurotypical (film) =

- Film poster
- Directed by: Adam Larsen
- Release date: July 29, 2013
- Running time: 52 minutes
- Country: United States
- Language: English

Neurotypical is a 2013 documentary film directed by Adam Larsen. The film shows perspectives on life from the viewpoint of autistic individuals. Neurotypical was shot mostly in North Carolina and Virginia.

== Cast ==
- Wolf Dunaway as himself
- Violet as herself
- Nicholas as himself
- Paula as herself
- Maddi as herself
- John as himself
