= Rosie King =

Storytelling activist from the United Kingdom

- Born: c. 1998 (age 27–28)
- Occupations: writer, public speaker and autism advocate
- Known for: regarding her autism as an asset

Rosie King (born c. 1998) is a British writer, public speaker and autism advocate. She has featured in a BBC documentary on the subject, and is a prominent contributor to the Pablo TV series.

== Biography ==
King diagnosed herself with autism at the age of 10 after reading about it in the book Little Rainman: Autism - Through the Eyes of a Child which her parents had obtained to explain her brother's diagnosis. She was officially diagnosed with Asperger's and Tourette's syndrome after a year-long process. She was bullied in school because of her difference.

Her mother, Sharon King, published a fairy tale that featured an autistic character in 2010 and King contributed drawings to illustrate pixies, fairies and goblins. This led to her being featured in the 2012 BBC Newsround documentary My Autism and Me. That year it won the International Emmy Kids Award for Best Factual in Cannes and a UK Royal Television Society Craft & Design award. King herself was awarded the Yorkshire Children of Courage award after her appearance in this documentary. Her commitment to advocacy grew stronger when she encountered discrimination while applying for colleges and seeking employment opportunities.

At the 2014 edition of the TEDMED Conference she was invited to speak about her autism diagnosis. She spoke about how she sees her autism as an asset rather than something holding her back and how it is backward to place normality on a pedestal.

Imagine that was the best compliment you ever received, 'Wow you are really normal,'[...] compliments are: 'You are extraordinary, or you step outside the box, [or] you are amazing.' If people want to be these things, why are so many people striving to be normal? Why are people pouring their brilliant, individual light into a mould?

In 2017, she was cast in and began to contribute to the writing of the CBeebies animated TV show Pablo, which focuses on an autistic boy, for which she also voiced the character Llama, who displays many of the traits of autism, such as echolalia. In 2026, she returns as Llama's voice actor in the CBBC spin-off Pablo: Next Level.
