= Kassiane Asasumasu =

American autism rights activist

Kassiane A. Asasumasu (née Sibley; born 1982) is an American autism rights activist who is credited for coining several terms related to the neurodiversity movement, including neurodivergent, neurodivergence, and caregiver benevolence. As stated in the text Neurodiversity for Dummies, "Asasumasu's work set the stage for a broader understanding and acceptance of neurological differences", which "continue[s] to be shared, shaped and formed by all sorts of people who recogniz[e] that our world should be accepting, inclusive, and accommodating of people regardless of their neurotype".

== Early and personal life ==
Kassiane Asasumasu was born in 1982 and has seven siblings, all of whom are non-autistic. She was diagnosed as autistic when she was three years old and was bullied for much of her childhood.

Asasumasu has shared that she also has temporal lobe epilepsy and post-traumatic stress disorder as a result of applied behavior analysis.

Asasumasu is Hapa and Asian American. She is of Croatian, Japanese, Mongolian, and Romanian descent.

== Contributions ==
=== Neurodivergent and neurodivergence ===
Following the rise of the autism rights movement in the 1990s, many autistic advocates, including Asasumasu, recognized that a wide variety of people experienced the world in ways similar to autistic people, despite not being autistic. As a result, Asasumasu coined the related terms neurodivergent and neurodivergence circa 2000.

According to Asasumasu, these terms refer to those "whose neurocognitive functioning diverges from dominant societal norms in multiple ways". She intended for these terms to apply to a broad variety of people, not just people with neurodevelopmental disorders, such as autism, attention deficit hyperactivity disorder, and dyslexia. She further emphasized that it should not be used to exclude people but rather to include them. This term provided activists a way to advocate for increased rights and accessibility for non-autistic people who do not have typical neurocognitive functioning.

As stated in the text Neurodiversity for Dummies, "Asasumasu's work set the stage for a broader understanding and acceptance of neurological differences", which "continue[s] to be shared, shaped and formed by all sorts of people who recogniz[e] that our world should be accepting, inclusive, and accommodating of people regardless of their neurotype".

=== Caregiver benevolence ===
Asasumasu coined the term caregiver benevolence in 2014 to describe the overarching societal assumption that caregivers are "angelic, saint-like figure[s]" for offering their time, energy, and financial resources to care for a disabled person. In alignment with this belief, ignorance is the only harm caregivers can do to the disabled person in their care. Asasumasu argues that due to the presumption of caregiver benevolence, the relationships between disabled people and their caregivers are frequently framed through "claims of hardship and suffering" on behalf of the caregiver, while neglecting the harms caused to the disabled person on behalf of their caregiver; such a presumption and reframing can lead to society overlooking the abuse of disabled people.

== Publications ==
=== Book chapters ===
- Asasumasu, Kassiane (2017). "Plea from the Scariest Kid on the Block". In Brown, Lydia X. Z.; Ashkenazy, E.; Onaiwu, Morénike Giwa (eds.). All the Weight of Our Dreams: On Living Racialized Autism. Autism Women's Network. ISBN 978-0-99750-450-7.
- Asasumasu, Kassiane (2021). "What Your Daughter Deserves: Love, Safety, and the Truth". In Autistic Women and Nonbinary Network (ed.). Sincerely, Your Autistic Child: What People on the Autism Spectrum Wish Their Parents Knew About Growing Up, Acceptance, and Identity. Beacon Press. pp. 21–26. ISBN 978-0-8070-2569-7.

=== Journal articles ===
- Natri, Heini M.; Abubakare, Oluwatobi; Asasumasu, Kassiane; Basargekar, Abha; Beaud, Flavien; Botha, Monique; Bottema-Beutel, Kristen; Brea, Maria Rosa; Brown, Lydia X. Z.; Burr, Daisy A.; Cobbaert, Laurence; Dabbs, Chris; Denome, Donnie; Rosa, Shannon Des Roches; Doherty, Mary (April 2023). "Anti-ableist language is fully compatible with high-quality autism research: Response to S inger et al. (2023)". Autism Research. 16 (4): 673–676. doi:10.1002/aur.2928. hdl:10072/424797. ISSN 1939-3792. PMID 37087601.
