= Larry Bissonnette =

American autistic artist (born 1957)

- Born: 1957 (age 67–68); Winooski, Vermont, U.S.
- Occupation(s): Artist, Activist

Larry John Bissonnette (born 1957 in Winooski, Vermont) is an American autistic artist who starred in two films showcasing his art and travels. 2005 in My Classic Life as an Artist and in 2011 Wretches & Jabberers. Both films have been criticized by the science community for claiming that Bissonnette can communicate through the discredited pseudoscience facilitated communication.

== Biography ==
Bissonnette is the son of Albert Bissonnette and his wife Alma Marie, née Bashaw. He has three brothers and sisters. At age two, he experienced a high fever, which might have caused some kind of damage to his nervous system. By the time he was eight, he was sent to the Brandon Training School, which was Vermont's only institute for people with intellectual disabilities at the time. During this time, he used techniques of art such as drawing and painting to help himself through self-expression. By the time he was 18, he was transferred to Vermont Psychiatric Hospital in Waterbury, Vermont. In 1991, Bissonnette was introduced to facilitated communication. Although this was quickly discredited as a valid communication technique (Skeptical Inquirer claims that "it is clear that their facilitators are prompting them by touching an arm or shoulder as they type"), Bissonnette and his therapists and facilitators continued to use it.

== Art ==
Bissonnette has created many works of art (over three hundred by 1990). In 1989, he received an honorable mention from the Vermont Council on the Arts for his painting and sculpture. Some of his works depict "faces peering through a veil, as if imprisoned". Bissonnette's art is in the collection of the Musée de l'Art Brut in Switzerland.

== In media ==
In 2005, Larry starred in his biographical film, My Classic Life as an Artist: A Portrait of Larry Bissonnette.

In 2011, Larry and his ally Tracy Thresher were in a documentary called Wretches & Jabberers, which documented his travels around the world. The film has been criticized for claiming that Bissonnette and Thresher can communicate through facilitated communication.

In 2012, they were both featured in an episode of the National Geographic Taboo television series which was titled "Strange Behavior".
