= Pablo (TV series) =

British-Irish animated series by Grainne McGuinness

- Title card
- Genre: Children's television
- Created by: Grainne McGuinness
- Directed by: David McGrath
- Voices of: Jake Williamson; Rachael Dickson; Sumita Majumdar; Scott Mulligan; Michael White; Rosie King; Tony Finnegan
- Composers: Michael Keeney & Kris Stronge
- Countries of origin: United Kingdom; Ireland (episodes only)
- Original language: English
- No. of series: 2
- No. of episodes: 105

Production
- Executive producer: Pauline MacNamara
- Producer: Graínne McGuinness
- Running time: 11 minutes
- Production companies: Paper Owl Films; Kavaleer Productions; Ingenious Media; Cake Entertainment (episodes only)

Original release
- Network: CBeebies (UK); RTÉjr (Ireland) (episodes only)
- Release: 2 October 2017 – 11 June 2020

Related
- Pablo: Next Level (2026-present)

Pablo is a British-Irish children's television series that premiered on CBeebies on 2 October 2017 and created by Grainne McGuinness. The series follows the adventures of Pablo James, a five-year-old (later 8-year-old) autistic boy, and his imaginary anthropomorphized animal friends, the Book Animals, who go on adventures in Pablo's "Art World". It is a hybrid of live action sequences and 2D animation. The series features a voice cast and writing team, with many of them being autistic.

It also broadcasts internationally, including on ABC Kids, Nat Geo Kids, CBC Kids, and S4C.

On 11 October 2021 it was announced a third series was in development. This season will be reworked, with Pablo now eight years old and with a redesigned art style, and be for an older audience. On 1 April 2022, BBC Children's announced it had commissioned the third series, although in October 2024 it was refocused into a spin-off called Pablo: Next Level, which began airing on 7 September 2026 on CBBC.

== Format ==
=== Series 1 & 2 (2017–20) ===
A typical episode begins in the real world, where Pablo will be engaging in some sort of activity. When encountering a problem or something he doesn't understand (like the loss of his own smell following a bath or the unusual way sandwiches are cut to be rectangular rather than triangular), the episode will transition into an animated "art world", represented by Pablo's drawings. There, Pablo and the Book Animals work together to solve whatever problem is at hand.

=== Pablo: Next Level (2026) ===
Pablo, now eight years old, is in primary school, a fascinating and at times overwhelming place. With the Book Animals at his side, Pablo faces new challenges and adventures.

== Characters ==
Characters from Pablo, from left to right; Noa, Mouse, Llama, Pablo James, Tang, Wren, Draff

- Pablo James (played by William and Oliver Burns (live-action, S1-2), voiced by Jake Williamson (S1-2) and Alexander Myles (Next Level)): An autistic boy who loves to draw things in the Art World with his crayons. In the original series, he is non-verbal in the Real World, but talks in the Art World.
- Mouse (voiced by Rachael Dickson): A mouse who is very reliable, cute and organized, but hates loud sounds. She speaks in the third person.
- Noa (voiced by Tony Finnegan): Noa is a Noasaurus who is sensitive, but often does not know how to express his feelings. He "stims" by flapping his hands.
- Tang (voiced by Michael White (S1-2) and Hayden Minns-Cain (Next Level)): Tang is an orangutan who's the big, fun goofball of the group. He's always ready to do anything, but has problems reading social cues and is not always careful.
- Wren (voiced by Sumita Majumdar): Wren is a wren who is gentle and loves to sing and flap her wings. Her words in her comforting voice always soothe others when they are stressed.
- Llama (voiced by Rosie King): Llama is a llama who loves to skip around back and forth as physical "stimming". She has echolalia.
- Draff (voiced by Scott Mulligan (S1-2) and Riona Rees Tamkin (Next Level)): Draff is an intelligent giraffe. His most commonly used phrase is "in point of fact", as he loves explaining things; he represents Pablo's "infodumping" and his catchphrase "point of fact" is verbal stimming.
- Pablo's Mum (played by Rosie Barry): caring and attentive, she supports her son in any way she can. She mainly appears in the live-action segments.

== Episodes ==
Series	Episodes	Originally released	
Series	Episodes	First released	Last released
1	52	2 October 2017	24 September 2018
2	52	7 October 2019	13 April 2020
Special		11 June 2020	
3	40	7 September 2026	TBA

=== Series 1 (2017–18) ===
No.	Title	Written by	Original release date
1	"Big Purple Bird"	Andrew Brenner, Based on an idea by Paul Isaacs	2 October 2017
Pablo thinks his mum's fascinator is a strange purple bird and doesn't know where his mum is.
2	"The Party Present"	Andrew Brenner	3 October 2017
Pablo hides from a birthday party.
3	"The Big Book of Animals"	Andrew Brenner	4 October 2017
Pablo can't find his favourite book.
4	"The Lost Smell"	Andrew Brenner, Based on an idea by Donna Williams	5 October 2017
After having a bath, Pablo goes in search of his lost smell.
5	"The Super Place"	Sumita Majumdar & Andrew Brenner	6 October 2017
Mouse finds the noisy colours of the supermarket overwhelming, so Pablo and his friends try to help.
6	"The Noise Dragon"	Andrew Brenner, Based on an idea by Paul Isaacs	9 October 2017
When Pablo is woken by banging and scraping he draws a cave to hide in, afraid of the noise dragon.
7	"Taste of Triangles"	Sumita Majumdar & Andrew Brenner	10 October 2017
Pablo doesn't like his sandwiches being square: he likes them as triangles.
8	"Goodnight Blues"	Andrew Brenner	11 October 2017
It's bedtime, but Pablo keeps turning the light back on. Wren worries that when you go to sleep, you disappear, and Pablo agrees with it.
9	"Mirror Boy"	Andrew Brenner	12 October 2017
Pablo is fascinated with the boy in the mirror. He draws his new friend and introduces him to the art world.
10	"The Fiona"	Andrew Brenner	13 October 2017
Pablo meets Mum's friend, Fiona.
11	"Talked Out"	Andrew Brenner, Based on an idea by Donna Williams	16 October 2017
Pablo doesn't want to talk, but Draff just can't stop!
12	"The Sparkles"	Andrew Brenner, Based on an idea by Paul Issacs	17 October 2017
Pablo is splashing in a puddle, making little spots of light dance on the surface. Everyone loves these sparkles and tries to catch them.
13	"The Aroma"	Sumita Majumdar & Andrew Brenner	18 October 2017
There is an unusual smell in the house. In the Art World this aroma becomes a swirling character that makes it hard to think or speak at all.
14	"Squeak, Squeak, Squeak"	Andrew Brenner	19 October 2017
One day Pablo hears a strange sound and discovers his Mum has some squeaky new shoes. He wants to know what they're trying to say.
15	"Big Coat, Small Coat"	Andrew Brenner	20 October 2017
When Pablo's mum says his coat is getting too small, Pablo is horrified. He draws himself small so his old coat will still fit.
16	"Tummy Talk"	Andrew Brenner, Based on an idea by Paul Issacs	13 November 2017
Pablo is making funny noises. Noa thinks he's swallowed something. They realise it's his tummy, but nobody knows what it's trying to say.
17	"The New Crayons"	Sumita Majumdar & Andrew Brenner	14 November 2017
Pablo's old crayons are running out, but his new ones are the wrong shade, design and smell. How will he be able to draw?
18	"Chasing the Breeze"	Andrew Brenner	15 November 2017
Pablo loves feeling the breeze as he swings on the swing. When it's someone else's turn, Pablo enters the Art World and draws a swing.
19	"Facts and Mistakes"	Andrew Brenner, Based on an idea by Rachael Dickson	16 November 2017
Pablo makes a mistake in drawing himself, so he decides not to draw himself at all. But his friends in the Art World want to find him.
20	"Scaredy Cat"	Rosie King	17 November 2017
Pablo is scared by a print on the wall of a cafe. He draws a very confusing world in response and decides it's okay to be a scaredy cat.
21	"One Mum's Rubbish"	Sumita Majumdar & Andrew Brenner	20 November 2017
Pablo likes plastic ice cream spoons even more than ice cream. He keeps them and makes them his friends.
22	"The Wildman"	Andrew Brenner	21 November 2017
Pablo doesn't want a haircut, so he draws a picture and enters the Art World. But Tang warns him about becoming The Wildman.
23	"Slippy Mouth"	Andrew Brenner, Based on an idea by Paul Issacs	22 November 2017
Pablo's mum's voice sounds disjointed and garbled. Draff thinks it sounds like Slippy Mouth, a very naughty creature who jumbles words up.
24	"Zoom! Zoom! Zoom!"	Andrew Brenner, Based on an idea by Donna Williams	23 November 2017
Pablo and the Book Animals are playing with words, treating them as meaningless sounds, which Mouse and Draff find very confusing.
25	"Paint the Music"	Andrew Brenner	24 November 2017
Pablo uses his crayons like a conductor and draws colourful music, but Draff insists that music is for your ears, not your eyes.
26	"Feeling Scribbly"	Sumita Majumdar & Andrew Brenner	27 November 2017
Pablo feels uncomfortable and doesn't know why. He draws himself as a scribble and his friends have to figure out who he is.
27	"Into the Fluff"	Andrew Brenner, Based on an idea by Donna Williams	28 November 2017
Pablo imagines himself shrinking down and exploring colorful fluff.
28	"Crisps Everywhere"	Sumita Majumdar & Andrew Brenner	3 April 2018
Pablo spills a packet of crisps everywhere. He goes to the top of a mountain, the bottom of the sea and the moon to get them back.
29	"Happiness"	Andrew Brenner, Based on an idea by Paul Issacs	4 April 2018
Pablo has a funny tickly feeling inside and doesn't know what to make of it. In the Art World his friends discover he's full of happy sparkles.
30	"Pick Us, Pablo"	Rosie King	5 April 2018
Pablo does not know which pair of shoes to put on.
31	"The Duvetsaurus"	Andrew Brenner	6 April 2018
Pablo does not want to get dressed because his clothes are itchy.
32	"Surprise"	Sumita Majumdar & Andrew Brenner	9 April 2018
Pablo receives a late birthday present, but is afraid to open it.
33	"Mr Whizzy"	Andrew Brenner	10 April 2018
Pablo is fascinated by a whisk.
34	"When Foods Collide"	Sumita Majumdar & Andrew Brenner	11 April 2018
Pablo can't eat his lunch: his egg and spaghetti hoops are touching.
35	"Word Search"	Sumita Majumdar & Andrew Brenner	12 April 2018
Pablo can't tell his grandma what he wants for his breakfast.
36	"Everything Pineapple"	Sumita Majumdar & Andrew Brenner	13 April 2018
Pablo can't stop tasting pineapple everywhere.
37	"Night Noises"	Tony Finnegan	16 April 2018
Pablo hears strange sounds when he sleeps.
38	"Back and Forth"	Tony Finnegan	17 April 2018
Pablo wishes he could make time go faster so his dessert will be ready sooner.
39	"Around the Houses"	Stuart Vallantine and Andrew Brenner	18 April 2018
Pablo and his Mum are waiting for a bus, which isn't on time.
40	"Flapping Away"	Andrew Brenner	19 April 2018
Pablo is enjoying flapping his arms so much that he is unable to listen to his Mum or to his animal friends.
41	"The Smell Gobbler"	Tony Finnegan	20 April 2018
When Mum leaves a can of air freshener on the counter, it's up to Pablo and his friends to stop The Smell Gobbler eating all the smells in the house, including the nice ones.
42	"Feeling Floaty"	Sumita Majumdar & Andrew Brenner	10 September 2018
Pablo thinks he'll float away.
43	"Scab Billy"	Rosie King	11 September 2018
Pablo discovers a scab on his knee and is upset.
44	"Face Feelings"	Sumita Majumdar & Andrew Brenner	12 September 2018
Pablo learns his face is saying things he doesn't know about.
45	"The Lift"	Michael White	13 September 2018
Pablo is worried about the lift at the department store, so his friends in the Art World reassure him that he will be able to get out again.
46	"Book Spider"	Michael White	14 September 2018
Pablo loves the Book Animals, but when he gets a new book with a spider in it, Pablo thinks the spider looks scary. But it turns out the spider is a bit frightened as well.
47	"Missing Music"	Rosie King	17 September 2018
Pablo hears a song on the radio and wants to hear it again, but he can't make it come out anymore. The Book Animals try to help him find a way to get it back again.
48	"Zip It"	Sumita Majumdar & Andrew Brenner	18 September 2018
Pablo is fascinated with the way the zipper on his coat closes up and opens again. With his friends in the Art World Pablo explores the magic of opening and closing things.
49	"Journey to the Centre of the Telly"	Rosie King	19 September 2018
Pablo wants to know what is happening to the characters on his favourite TV program after the TV is turned off. Luckily Noa has an idea about how they can find out!
50	"Captain Pinecone"	Sumita Majumdar & Andrew Brenner	20 September 2018
Pablo has two pinecones for tapping, which turn out to be explorers! They lead the Book Animals on a journey to discover sounds and textures and Llama makes an aural map.
51	"How Are You?"	Sumita Majumdar & Andrew Brenner	22 September 2018
When Mum's buddy Fiona comes over to visit and asks Pablo how he is, Pablo doesn't know the answer. He explores the question with his friends in the Art World and they all try to figure out what it means.
52	"Water Boy"	Sumita Majumdar & Andrew Brenner, Based on an idea by Paul Issacs	24 September 2018
Pablo loves watching the rain. Some of his in the Art World friends don't. Draff and Mouse hate getting wet, but Pablo loves the rain so much that he actually turns into it!

=== Series 2 (2019–20) ===
Starting with "The New Sofa" on 7 October 2019, all the week's Pablo episodes would be made available on BBC iPlayer before their individual broadcast on CBeebies. From "Finger Prince" onwards, however, episodes would only go on iPlayer after their individual broadcast.

No.	Title	Written by	Original release date
1	"The New Sofa"	Michael White	7 October 2019
Pablo's Mum buys a new sofa, but Pablo isn't happy. Why can't it be like his old sofa?
2	"Chicken Pops"	Michael White	8 October 2019
Pablo and the Book Animals get chickenpox and don't know what to do!
3	"Llama the Lion"	Sumita Majumdar & Andrew Brenner	9 October 2019
When Pablo's cardigan gets in the way of playing with his shiny things, Llama must lead the way through.
4	"The Swimming Pool"	Sumita Majumdar & Andrew Brenner	10 October 2019
Pablo goes to the pool, but will the echoey walls, the cold, wet floor and the smell of chlorine be too much to deal with?
5	"The Number Snake"	Sumita Majumdar & Andrew Brenner	11 October 2019
Pablo is entranced by the strange thing his Mum uses for measuring, and before long, meets the marvelous Number Snake.
6	"Up in the Clouds"	Stuart Vallantine & Andrew Brenner	14 October 2019
Pablo and the Book Animals are about to fly on a plane, but how will they get on?
7	"Locomotion"	Michael White	15 October 2019
Can Pablo make the sad steam trains at the transport museum happy again?
8	"The Floating Mattress"	Tony Finnegan	16 October 2019
Pablo's new mattress is so high it floats! Can he and the Book Animals bring it back to the ground?
9	"Magic Towel"	Sumita Majumdar & Andrew Brenner	17 October 2019
A paper towel advert has such a catchy jingle that Pablo keeps spilling his juice.
10	"Bleugh"	Sumita Majumdar & Andrew Brenner	18 October 2019
Pablo can't make up his mind: should he go to the library or the pool?
11	"A Visit to the Zoo"	Michael White	21 October 2019
The Book Animals pay a visit to their families at the zoo - but where's Noa's?
12	"What a Picture"	Michael White	22 October 2019
Pablo and the Book Animals try to deal with a camera that never stops taking pictures. Or flashing!
13	"Tom"	Rosie King	23 October 2019
Pablo is worried about meeting Mum's new boyfriend, and him coming for tea. Can the Book Animals help him?
14	"Big Boy"	Michael White	24 October 2019
There's a big slide at the indoor playground, but Mum says it's only for big children. Soon, Tang learns why Pablo must wait.
15	"Sorry Bowl"	Sumita Majumdar & Andrew Brenner	25 October 2019
Pablo feels sorry for a bowl Mum didn't use. But how can a bowl have feelings? Does everything?
16	"Too Many Tasks"	Tony Finnegan	18 November 2019
Pablo is told to clean his room, but all the toys and objects keep calling for his attention. How can Pablo get this muddle sorted?
17	"The Guinea Pig"	Sumita Majumdar & Andrew Brenner	19 November 2019
Lorna shows off her new pet guinea pig to Pablo. Pablo is unsure about how to act around it: Noa is unsure, Mouse is cautious and Tang wants to scoop it right up! How will the group learn how to treat it?
18	"The Gift"	Michael White, Based on an idea by Donna Williams	20 November 2019
Thanks to his Uncle John, Pablo has two toy cars and they are exactly the same make. One must go back to the shop, but which one?
19	"Can't Touch This"	Sumita Majumdar & Andrew Brenner	21 November 2019
Pablo is warned not to touch the doughnuts, flowers or vase on the table. However, this only makes Tang want to touch them more!
20	"My Fluffy Friend"	Andrew Brenner	22 November 2019
Pablo has a fluffy jacket that he absolutely adores wearing. Mum says he doesn't need it inside, but Pablo wants to keep it on - otherwise, it'll get lonely.
21	"In Point of Draff"	Sumita Majumdar & Andrew Brenner	25 November 2019
When Lorna offers to play with Pablo's cars, he puts them right back in the box. It turns out, this is because of Draff's orderliness. How will Pablo have any fun?
22	"Hiding Places"	Sumita Majumdar & Andrew Brenner	26 November 2019
At dinner, Fiona keeps looking at Pablo. Embarrassed by the unwanted attention, Pablo turns himself invisible.
23	"Nothing to Worry About"	Sumita Majumdar & Andrew Brenner	27 November 2019
Mum says she's lost nothing - but Pablo tries to figure out where her 'nothing' has gone to.
24	"Box of Buttons"	Sumita Majumdar & Andrew Brenner	28 November 2019
Pablo really loves Uncle John's box of buttons, but Tang can't stop mucking about with them. Now they're loose!
25	"Magic Post Box"	Sumita Majumdar & Andrew Brenner	29 November 2019
When Mum's parcel is lost in the post, Pablo and the Book Animals go on an adventure through the postal system to find it.
26	"Toy Shop"	Michael White	2 December 2019
Pablo arrives in the toy shop just as it's closing. The toys would like to go to bed, but Pablo doesn't want to leave!
27	"Finger Prince"	Sumita Majumdar & Andrew Brenner	9 March 2020
Pablo is not very happy when some jammy fingerprints appear on his picture, but the fingerprints want to stay.
28	"The Repair Person"	Sumita Majumdar & Andrew Brenner	10 March 2020
When the heating stops working, Pablo is scared of the Repair Person coming round, somebody he doesn't know. The radiators are scared too.
29	"Distractionland"	Michael White	11 March 2020
When Pablo gets lost in Distraction Land, Draff tries to keep everyone together while they search for him.
30	"The Hut"	Anna Greenberg & Andrew Brenner	12 March 2020
In the Super Place, Pablo is surprised to find a hut. The Book Animals try to help him work out what it's for, but as far as Pablo's concerned it doesn't belong!
31	"Buzz, Buzz, Buzz"	Sumita Majumdar & Andrew Brenner	13 March 2020
The buzzy sound of a fly is muddling up everything for Pablo and making it really hard for him to concentrate.
32	"Goodbye! Goodbye! Goodbye!"	Sumita Majumdar & Andrew Brenner	16 March 2020
Mum's friend Fiona has already said goodbye, so why are they still chatting at the front door? This leaves Pablo very confused!
33	"Murky Moods"	Tony Finnegan	17 March 2020
It's a foggy day, so Pablo and the Book Animals have to work together to find a way to put the colour back into their lives and be happy again!
34	"Sun Cream"	Michael White	18 March 2020
It's a hot sunny day, but Mum is making Pablo stay in the shade because he doesn't want any cold and sticky sun cream!
35	"Wheel of Pasta"	Sumita Majumdar & Andrew Brenner	19 March 2020
Pablo is overwhelmed by all the different pasta shapes calling to him in the Super Place. He can't choose!
36	"Headache Volcano"	Abel Diaz	20 March 2020
Pablo gets a "funny feeling" in his head, and it won't go away. Can the Book Animals help?
37	"Follow the Shapes"	Sumita Majumdar & Andrew Brenner	23 March 2020
The sounds and shapes of a noisy cafe keep taking Pablo and his friends to different places, from which they need to find a way back.
38	"Oink, Cluck, Neigh!"	Abel Diaz	24 March 2020
Visiting the city farm, Pablo sees the simpler lives of the animals and decides to become one. Can the Book Animals change his mind?
39	"Touchy Feely"	Anna Greenberg & Andrew Brenner	25 March 2020
Pablo is fascinated by the wrinkly hands of his elderly neighbour. He wants to see what they feel like and travel into the wonderful world of the landscape they evoke.
40	"Joining Out"	Sumita Majumdar & Andrew Brenner	26 March 2020
Pablo wants to play with Lorna and her friend, but it's making Noa feel wobbly and that makes the Art World wobbly too. Can they all find a way to play without joining in?
41	"Draff's Robot"	Andrew Brenner, Based on an idea by Paul Issacs	27 March 2020
People don't always want to hear Draff's facts, so he decides to draw himself a robot who will. But is a robot that says you're right all the time really a better friend?
42	"In Point of View"	Michael White	30 March 2020
Pablo finds Granny's glasses, but he can't see through them properly. Mouse thinks they're broken, Tang wants to make new ones and the sofa wants to hide them again.
43	"The Missing Colours"	Constantíne	31 March 2020
Pablo and his cousin are drawing together, but when Pablo thinks Lorna has taken some of his colours, he is upset. Luckily, Mouse can remember what really happened.
44	"Pablo's Away Dream"	Andrew Brenner, Based on an idea by Paul Issacs	1 April 2020
Pablo is sitting still and staring into space. His friends wonder what's up, until Wren finds another Pablo up in the fluffy clouds, taking a break from life's many demands.
45	"Personal Space"	Andy Norton	2 April 2020
When Pablo tries to approach other children in the park, they move away. He has to learn how to show that he is friendly, so Llama helps Draff teach him about personal space.
46	"Quieter Than A Mouse"	Constantíne	3 April 2020
When Pablo goes to sleep at his Granny's, it's too quiet even for Mouse! Pablo and his friends miss the sounds of their city home. Luckily, Granny has an idea that can help.
47	"Round and Round and Round"	Sumita Majumdar & Andrew Brenner	6 April 2020
Pablo is playing the same song repeatedly and won't stop. He and the Book Animals enjoy the feeling shapes, but Draff warns them not to get stuck in a loop!
48	"Stage Fright"	Michael White	7 April 2020
Pablo finds it difficult when people look at him or give him compliments, so when the Book Animals have a talent show, Pablo doesn't want to perform unless he can't be seen.
49	"The Zebra and the Bus"	Constantíne	8 April 2020
Pablo and his friends are happily singing The Wheels on the Bus, but a police zebra makes them stop because it is not true that the wheels go round all day long.
50	"The Dentist"	Rosie King	9 April 2020
Pablo is scared of going to the dentist, so the Book Animals and the dentist's tools work together to show him that the dentist is only trying to help his sore tooth.
51	"The Spork"	Constantíne	10 April 2020
Pablo and his mum are having a picnic, but the only thing Pablo has to eat with is a surprising object that doesn't seem to be a fork or a spoon. What is he supposed to do?
52	"Umbrella"	Sumita Majumdar & Andrew Brenner	13 April 2020
Pablo is sad to come in from the rain, but says he's happy being sad. The umbrella understands; you can be more than one thing, like wet on one side and dry on the other.

=== Special (2020) ===
In addition to the main programme, a series of online shorts were produced in 2019. These include Going to School, Pack for School, Making Friends and Everything Pumpkin. In 2020, during the COVID-19 pandemic, an episode-length special was produced.

No.	Title	Written by	Original release date
1	"House Time"	Sumita Majumdar & Andrew Brenner	11 June 2020
Pablo has had to be in the house a lot more than before. He thinks about what it was like getting used to this and worries about things having to change again. With the Book Animals, Pablo creates a sparkly place, to embrace the things that he knows and loves, and remembers that even though some things keep changing, not everything has to change.

=== Pablo: Next Level (2026) ===
No.	Title	Written by	Original release date
1	"Friendship Enquiry"	Joe Wells	7 September 2026
Pablo hears Clio saying Anne is her best friend and gets into a panic thinking that he is also supposed to have one - an idea that Wren finds appalling.
2	"Jellyball Rules"	Joe Wells	7 September 2026 (BBC iPlayer); 8 September 2026 (CBBC)
Pablo finds making eye contact extremely uncomfortable, so he tries to work out a way to get Mr Bird to change his rule about looking at him when he is speaking.
3	"To Throw, Or Not To Throw"	Robert White	7 September 2026 (BBC iPlayer); 9 September 2026 (CBBC)
As Pablo anticipates his turn to throw a ball in PE, his inner world is thrown into a turmoil of overthinking, impulse control and anxiety. Note: The episode title on BBC iPlayer removes the comma from the name of the episode.
4	"Mr Bird's Lipstick"	Aofie Dooley	7 September 2026 (BBC iPlayer); 10 September 2026 (CBBC)
Pablo is sent on an errand and discovers the quiet peace of the empty hallway, until Tang turns the outing into a search for a mysterious bear on a skateboard.
5	"How To Be Cool"	Aofie Dooley	7 September 2026 (BBC iPlayer); 11 September 2026 (CBBC)
When Eoin shows Pablo funny videos of a boy called Evan Stephens, Pablo decides to try to be cool and get likes by copying the influencer - with disastrous results!
6	"Wet Break"	Joe Wells	14 September 2026
When it’s too wet to go out in the playground, Pablo and the Book Animals struggle to find a way to survive the chaos of having break time in the classroom.
7	"The Bruise"	Robert White	14 September 2026 (BBC iPlayer); 15 September 2026 (CBBC)
When Pablo’s apple gets bruised, he can’t decide if it’s okay to eat, so he keeps it for a week while the Book Animals and a wizard try to help him work out what to do.
8	"Noises Cancelled"	Robert White	14 September 2026 (BBC iPlayer); 16 September 2026 (CBBC)
Pablo loves the peace and quiet of wearing headphones to block out extra noises, but when Eoin says something, he begins to worry that wearing them is uncool.
9	"Found Property"	Sumita Majumdar	14 September 2026 (BBC iPlayer); 17 September 2026 (CBBC)
Milo is so happy to find a special magnet that Eoin stops Pablo telling him that it belongs to him. However, Pablo senses Eoin’s sadness and wants to help get his magnet back.
10	"Clay Day"	Eryn Tett	14 September 2026 (BBC iPlayer); 18 September 2026 (CBBC)
Pablo loves art and is excited by the idea of making a clay pot. But when Mouse sees the clay, she gets freaked out by the texture and doesn’t want Pablo to touch it.
11	"Looping Monster"	Eryn Tett	21 September 2026
When Pablo gets excited about going to the lake after lunch and seeing ducklings, he is visited by a looping monster and can’t think about anything else at all.
12	"Keeping Order"	Eryn Tett	21 September 2026 (BBC iPlayer); 22 September 2026 (CBBC)
A change in the order of their class presentations leaves Pablo desperate to be fourth again, until he sees Sorcha having a worse time than he is - waiting to be last.
13	"How Are You"	Joe Wells	21 September 2026 (BBC iPlayer); 23 September 2026 (CBBC)
When Mr Bird asks how he is, Pablo explains in detail, but is shocked to discover that he’s not expected to tell the truth, just say, ‘I’m good, thanks, how are you?’
14	"Shoelaces Rule"	Sumita Majumdar	24 September 2026
Pablo feels scribbly every time somebody asks him to tie his shoelaces, and even though he really wants to, he can’t do it, until those feelings have passed.
15	"Brumation"	Sumita Majumdar	21 September 2026 (BBC iPlayer); 25 September 2026 (CBBC)
When the bulb in Breadcrumbs’s vivarium fails, Pablo is so concerned that he slips into a semi-dormant state (like a lizard) to conserve energy until order can be restored.
16	"Wet Jumper"	TBA	28 September 2026
Pablo loves his new jumper like a friend... until it gets wet, and Mouse wants to get rid of it.
17	"Come with Me, Please"	TBA	28 September 2026 (BBC iPlayer); 29 September 2026 (CBBC)
When Ms Boyle starts calling children out of the class, Pablo’s imagination runs wild.
18	"Loading"	TBA	28 September 2026 (BBC iPlayer); 30 September 2026 (CBBC)
The timetable keeps changing, but Pablo discovers Anne is the one struggling with it, not him. Luckily, Pablo is an expert at being anxious about unexpected changes.
19	"The Fluffy Side"	TBA	28 September 2026 (BBC iPlayer); 1 October 2026 (CBBC)
When Pablo notices that his socks are fluffy side out and Ben’s are fluffy side in, it sets Draff off on a quest to work out the right and wrong ways to use many things.
20	"Animal Overload"	TBA	28 September 2026 (BBC iPlayer); 2 October 2026 (CBBC)
Pablo can’t find the right time to share his animal facts, but when his inner world fills up with wild animals, he discovers that not sharing them is a problem too.

== Awards ==
Pablo won Best Preschool Programme at the 2019 Broadcast Awards. It was nominated at the 2018 British Academy Children's Awards in Digital, was a Children's Finalist at the 2018 Royal Television Society Awards and won the TORC Award for Excellence at the 2018 Celtic Media Festival. It was nominated at the 2021 Irish Animation Awards for Best Animated Preschool Series and Best Writer for Preschool Animation (for Andrew Brenner, which it won).

== Spin-off books ==
In April 2020, Ladybird began publishing a series of picture books, adapted from previous Pablo episodes. Sumita Majumdar and Andrew Brenner, who wrote on the series, oversaw these.

1. Goodnight Pablo (based on "Goodnight Blues"), ISBN 9780241415245
2. Pablo and the Noisy Party (based on "The Party Present"), ISBN 9780241415740
3. Pablo Picks His Shoes (based on "Pick Us Pablo"), ISBN 9780241415757
4. Pablo's Feelings (based on "Face Feelings"), ISBN 9780241415764
5. Pablo Goes Shopping (based on "The Super Place"), ISBN 9780241490273
6. Pablo at the Zoo, ISBN 9780241490280

There will also be "Ladybird Readers" Level 1 books, designed to aid children develop their speech, reading and writing skills.

1. Pablo Chooses His Shoes, ISBN 9780241533741
2. Are You Sad, Pablo?, ISBN 9780241475546
3. Pablo: Noisy Party, ISBN 9780241475492

== Stage version ==
In 2019, it was announced Selladoor Worldwide is developing a stage musical adaptation of Pablo, in collaboration with Paper Owl Films. The original creative team will be involved.

== See also ==
- A Kind of Spark, another BBC children's series performed and written by autistic people.
- Ready Eddie Go!, a Sky Kids series also about a small autistic boy, performed and written by autistic people.
