= Too Sane for This World =

- Directed by: William Davenport
- Written by: William Davenport
- Production company: Talk Story Films
- Release dates: September 1, 2011 (Too Sane for This World); April 1, 2013 (Citizen Autistic)
- Country: United States
- Language: English

Too Sane for This World is a documentary series that was directed by William Davenport. The first film, Too Sane for This World, was released on September 1, 2011, and features an introduction by Dr. Temple Grandin. The second documentary, Citizen Autistic, was released on April 1, 2013.

== Synopsis ==
=== Too Sane for This World ===
Too Sane for This World explores autism and discusses the challenges that people with autism face in the world. The documentary also discusses the need for society to address the concerns being voiced within the autism community, and features questions posed by adults on the spectrum. The movie is a collaboration between neurotypical and neurodivergent filmmakers.

=== Citizen Autistic ===
Citizen Autistic is centered on the politics of autism and the rights of all disabled individuals. Davenport looks into autism and how it relates to unemployment, as well as what government services are made available to autistic persons and whether or not it meets the actual needs of the average person. The movie features interviews with autistic persons and their families, as well as with Ari Ne'eman, who is the founder of the Autistic Self Advocacy Network (ASAN) and also serves on U.S. President Barack Obama's National Council on Disability.

=== Untitled third film ===
The third film will explore how autism is diagnosed and what type of therapies are being implemented around the world, as different cultures approach the diagnosis differently. The documentary also questions what exactly is autism and will interview several parents whose children were recently diagnosed with autism. The various treatments utilized for autism, both traditional and non-traditional, will also be explored.
