= Recovered: Journeys Through the Autism Spectrum and Back =

- Directed by: Michele Jaquis; Dr. Doreen Granpeesheh (executive)
- Produced by: Dr. Doreen Granpeesheh
- Starring: Ruffin; Janna; Brett; Nick; Dr. Doreen Granpeesheh; Cathy Vizconde; Vince Redmond Jr. Evelyn Kung
- Release date: April 25, 2008
- Running time: 57 minutes
- Country: United States
- Language: English

Recovered: Journeys Through the Autism Spectrum and Back is a 2008 American documentary directed by Michele Jaquis and co-produced by psychologist Doreen Granpeesheh and her business, the Center for Autism and Related Disorders (CARD). The film focuses on four children that Granpeesheh and other CARD staff claim fully "recovered" from autism and co-occurring intellectual disability after receiving intensive, long-term applied behavior analysis (ABA). Recovered premiered on April 25, 2008, at the Pacific Design Center's SilverScreen Theater.

== Synopsis ==
Recovered focuses on four children who Granpeesheh (the founder and executive director of CARD) and other CARD staff claim fully "recovered" from autism (a lifelong neurodevelopmental disorder with no cure) and co-occurring intellectual disability. Each child received services from CARD, including assessments, supervision, parent/teacher training and intensive, long-term ABA. The film documents the children's ABA sessions and interviews the children (as teenagers), their parents, Granpeesheh and other CARD staff.

In the film, Granpeesheh stated, "There's a lot of scientific research that shows children recover from autism, and yet, still, the medical community in general is not aware of how prevalent recovery is. More than half of the children receiving intervention at an early age recover completely."

== Distribution ==
Recovered was self-distributed through its website.

== Reception ==
Recovered won Best Documentary in the 2008 Director's Chair Film Festival in Staten Island, NY.
