= Wretches & Jabberers =

Documentary film promoting facilitated communication

- Theatrical release poster
- Directed by: Gerardine Wurzburg
- Produced by: Douglas Biklen; Gerardine Wurzburg
- Cinematography: Gary Griffin
- Edited by: Barbara Ballow
- Music by: J. Ralph
- Production companies: State of the Art, Inc.
- Release date: April 1, 2011
- Running time: 90 minutes
- Country: United States
- Language: English

Wretches & Jabberers is a 2011 American documentary film directed by Gerardine Wurzburg and produced by Wurzburg and Douglas Biklen.

The film is about two autistic men, Larry Bissonnette and Tracy Thresher, who travel with their aides to Sri Lanka, Japan, and Finland to meet other autistic people with limited ability to converse verbally, and to challenge attitudes about disability and intelligence. The film's title comes from a comment made by one of the people they visit in Finland, who groups people into "wretches" like all of them and "jabberers" who speak easily.

It opened in the United States on April 1, 2011. Notably, the men use facilitated communication to communicate, which is a scientifically discredited technique.

== See also ==
- Rapid prompting method

Films

- Annie's Coming Out
- Autism Is a World
- Deej

People

- Naoki Higashida

Books

- The Reason I Jump
- Fall Down 7 Times Get Up 8
