= Center for Autism and Related Disorders =

Applied behavior analysis provider

- Type: Incorporation
- Founded: 1990
- Founder: Doreen Granpeesheh
- Headquarters: Los Angeles, California, United States
- Area served: United States
- Services: ABA-based therapies, including early intensive behavioral intervention (EIBI) and social skills training
- Divisions: CARD Academy
- Website: centerforautism.com

The Center for Autism and Related Disorders, Inc. (CARD) is a business that administers applied behavior analysis (ABA) to autistic people.

== History ==
CARD was founded in 1990 by Doreen Granpeesheh, a former graduate student of Ole Ivar Løvaas, the UCLA psychology professor who popularized the use of ABA on autistic children.

=== Acquisition by Blackstone (2018–2019) ===
In May 2018, the Blackstone Group acquired CARD in a leveraged buyout valued at approximately US$600–700 million, one of the largest transactions in the behavioral-health sector. Granpeesheh stepped down as CEO in 2019 but remained on the company’s board. Blackstone planned to scale CARD to over 500 clinics using data analytics and centralized management.

Former staff later reported that after the acquisition, corporate leadership reduced centralized clinical training and replaced experienced clinicians with managers from outside behavioral health, leading to concerns about quality of care and high employee turnover.

=== Private equity era: growth and decline (2019–2023) ===
==== Growth and labor issues ====
By 2020, CARD operated around 230–250 centers nationwide. However, employees reported high turnover (over 150% annually) and low wages relative to workload.

==== Unionization efforts ====
In May 2019, while it was still under the ownership of Blackstone, employees at CARD's Portland East location voted to unionize, the first ABA clinic in the United States to do so. Prior to the vote, Granpeesheh appeared in person to plead with workers to vote against unionizing, and CARD hired anti-union consultants to intimidate staff. CARD permanently closed the Portland East location in January 2021, citing the impact of the COVID-19 pandemic. The company subsequently dismissed employee speculation that the Portland East location was targeted for closure because it had unionized.

==== Ethical and clinical concerns ====
The COVID-19 pandemic disrupted in-person services, and CARD’s telehealth expansion proved unsustainable. Critics and former staff alleged that under private equity ownership, clinical practices were increasingly standardized and profit-driven, reducing individualized care. CARD’s practices under private equity ownership were criticized for:

- Inflating treatment hours to maximize billing.
- Reducing supervision ratios (1 BCBA per 25–30 clients).
- Prioritizing preschool-age clients with higher insurance reimbursement.

These trends reflected a broader pattern of “financialization of care” identified by a CEPR report

The 2023 Center for Economic and Policy Research (CEPR) report concluded that private equity buyouts in autism services, exemplified by CARD, resulted in “reduced staffing, increased debt loads, and lower quality of care.”

=== Clinic closures and bankruptcy (2022–2023) ===
Beginning in mid-2022, CARD abruptly closed operations in ten states—including Oregon, Michigan, Missouri, and Rhode Island—citing “unsustainable reimbursement rates.”

In June 2023, CARD filed for Chapter 11 bankruptcy protection, reporting US$82 million in losses and US$245 million in debt. Under a court-approved stalking horse agreement, Granpeesheh’s company Pantogran LLC repurchased CARD’s remaining 130 centers for about US$25 million—less than 10% of its 2018 valuation.

The CEPR report concluded that Blackstone’s debt-loading and overexpansion turned CARD from a sustainable clinic network into “a cautionary example of financialized health care.”

== Legacy ==
CARD is widely recognized for establishing ABA as the predominant evidence-based treatment for autism. Its research initiatives and software platforms, such as Skills, influenced global clinical training and insurance models.

While CARD’s model is credited with expanding access to autism treatment, it has been criticized by neurodiversity advocates for promoting intensive behavioral modification and neglecting autistic self-advocacy perspectives. The organization’s financial collapse under private equity ownership has become a case study in debates about ethics and oversight in the corporatization of health care.

Following the 2023 bankruptcy proceedings of CARD, founder Doreen Granpeesheh reacquired the organization and resumed leadership of a smaller, downsized CARD network.

== Documentary ==
CARD co-produced (with Granpeesheh) and distributed Recovered: Journeys Through the Autism Spectrum and Back, a 2008 documentary about four children that the organization claims completely "recovered" from autism and co-occurring intellectual disability as a result of the intensive, longterm ABA they administered, despite the fact that there is no known cure for autism. In the film, Granpeesheh stated, "There's a lot of scientific research that shows children recover from autism, and yet, still, the medical community in general is not aware of how prevalent recovery is. More than half of the children receiving intervention at an early age recover completely." The film was directed and edited by Michele Jaquis in collaboration with Granpeesheh and won the Best Documentary award at the 2008 Director's Chair Film Festival.
