= Doreen Granpeesheh =

American psychologist

- Born: 1963 (age 62–63); Tehran, Iran
- Education: University of California, Los Angeles (PhD)
- Known for: Center for Autism and Related Disorders (CARD); Anti-vaccine activism
- Scientific career
- Fields: Clinical psychology Applied behavior analysis
- Workplaces: University of California, Los Angeles (UCLA)
- Thesis: The effects of teaching common preschool games to autistic children on increasing peer interaction (1990)

Doreen Granpeesheh (Persian: درّین گران‌پیشه, born 1963) is an Iranian-American psychologist and board certified behavior analyst. She is one of America's richest self-made women, with an estimated net worth of $400 million.

Granpeesheh founded the Center for Autism and Related Disorders (CARD), a firm that administers applied behavior analysis (ABA), in 1990. She sold the firm to the Blackstone Group for $300 million in 2018, and repurchased it in bankruptcy for $48.5 million in 2023.

Throughout her academic and professional career, Granpeesheh has promoted the fringe claim that "recovery" from autism (a lifelong neurodevelopmental disorder with no cure) is possible, primarily through intensive, longterm ABA administered at a young age. She has also promoted the scientifically disproven claim that there is a causal link between vaccines and autism.

== Early life and career ==
Granpeesheh was born in Tehran, Iran in 1963. In 1978, she visited relatives in Los Angeles, California for the summer. After the Iranian revolution commenced, her parents decided to enroll her in a boarding school in Los Angeles where she completed 11th and 12th grades, eventually permanently moving. She earned a PhD in psychology from the University of California, Los Angeles (UCLA), where she worked with clinical psychologist Ole Ivar Lovaas on his 1987 study that tested ABA on autistic children. Said study labeled nearly half of the test subjects specifically assigned to receive intensive, longterm ABA "recovered" from autism and co-occurring intellectual disability. However, the study has been criticized, in part, for not being randomly controlled, using allegedly flawed outcome measures and other methodologies and attempting to normalize the behavior of autistic children.

In 1990, Granpeesheh founded the Center for Autism and Related Disorders (CARD), a firm that administers ABA. The Blackstone Group, a private equity firm, acquired CARD for $300 million in 2018. Granpeesheh and the management at CARD invested in the company alongside Blackstone, and Granpeesheh remained the CEO until December 2019, when she was replaced by Anthony Kilgore and moved into the role of executive director. She resigned from the board in 2022 and retained a minority stake in the company. CARD filed for bankruptcy in June 2023 and Granpeesheh offered a $25 million to buy the company back from Blackstone. Granpeesheh won control of the company in July, having put together a $48 million dollar bid. Granpeesheh "bought back most of its operations for $25 million and took on some of its debt" in July 2023.

In 2005, Granpeesheh co-founded Autism Care and Treatment Today!, a nonprofit organization that builds awareness and provides grants to fund healthcare, safety, and technology needs for autistic individuals and their families. The organization was renamed Autism Care Today in 2018. Autism Care Today has donated over $1.85 million in grants to families.

From 2007 to 2009, Granpeesheh served on the board of directors of the Autism Society of America (ASA); she held the position of first vice chair in 2008 and 2009. Granpeesheh subsequently served on the organization's board of professional advisors, most recently being credited as an advisor in its 2021 annual report.

In 2008, Granpeesheh produced and appeared in the documentary Recovered: Journeys Through the Autism Spectrum and Back, which featured four children she claimed had fully recovered from autism and co-occurring intellectual disability after undergoing intensive, longterm ABA. In the film, Granpeesheh stated, "There's a lot of scientific research that shows children recover from autism, and yet, still, the medical community in general is not aware of how prevalent recovery is. More than half of the children receiving intervention at an early age recover completely."

In 2014, Granpeesheh published Evidence-Based Treatment for Children with Autism: The CARD Model with co-editors Jonathan Tarbox, Adel Najdowski, and Julie Kornack.

In 2016, Granpeesheh appeared in Andrew Wakefield's Vaxxed, a pseudoscientific propaganda film that pushed Wakefield's widely debunked theory that the MMR vaccine causes autism. Granpeesheh featured prominently in the film, falsely claiming that autism is caused by children "not detoxifying from the vaccinations" and can be treated with detoxification. Granpeesheh had previously worked with Wakefield at his clinic, the Thoughtful House Center for Children, and was a principal member of the company. While still associated with Thoughtful House, Granpeesheh co-presented an ABA continuing-education session at the ASA's 2008 national conference; the session focused on combining ABA with biomedical treatments (including detoxification) to achieve "optimal outcomes" for autistic children. In a 2023 interview, Granpeesheh rejected the label "anti-vaccine," while confirming that she still believed in the debunked detoxification theory.

In 2025, Granpeesheh appeared as herself in the fifth episode of the second season of The Rehearsal when Nathan Fielder came to speak to her.

Notable awards received by Granpeesheh include the 2011 George Winokur Clinical Research Paper Award from the American Academy of Clinical Psychiatrists and the 2007 Wendy F. Miller Professional of the Year Award from the ASA.
