= Journal of Developmental and Behavioral Pediatrics =

- Discipline: Pediatrics
- Language: English
- Edited by: Lee M. Pachter

Publication details
- History: 1980–present
- Publisher: Lippincott Williams & Wilkins
- Frequency: 6/year
- Impact factor: 2.2 (2024)

Standard abbreviations
- ISO 4: J. Dev. Behav. Pediatr.

Indexing
- CODEN: JDBPD5
- ISSN: 0196-206X (print); 1536-7312 (web)
- LCCN: 80644911
- OCLC no.: 5780657

Links
- Journal homepage; Online access; Online archive

The Journal of Developmental and Behavioral Pediatrics is a peer-reviewed medical journal covering developmental behavioral pediatrics. The journal was established in 1980 and is published by Lippincott Williams & Wilkins. The editor-in-chief is Lee Pachter (ChristianaCare). It is the official journal of the Society for Developmental and Behavioral Pediatrics.

== Abstracting and indexing ==
The journal is abstracted and indexed in:

- Science Citation Index Expanded
- Social Sciences Citation Index
- Current Contents/Social & Behavioral Sciences
- Current Contents/Clinical Medicine
- BIOSIS Previews
- Index Medicus/MEDLINE/PubMed

According to the Journal Citation Reports, the journal has a 2024 impact factor of 2.2.
