= Autism Is a World =

Documentary promoting a discredited communication technique

- Written by: Sue Rubin
- Directed by: Gerardine Wurzburg
- Country of origin: United States
- Original language: English

Production
- Producer: Gerardine Wurzburg

Original release
- Release: 2004

Autism Is a World is a 2004 American short subject documentary film by Academy Award Producer and Director Gerardine Wurzburg and allegedly written by Sue Rubin, an autistic woman who is said to have learned to communicate via the discredited technique of facilitated communication. It was nominated in the 77th annual Academy Awards for Best Documentary Short Subject.

== Synopsis ==
Rubin is an autistic woman who was diagnosed as intellectually disabled in early childhood. The film alleges that at the age of thirteen, she learned to express herself through typing of a computer keyboard, revealing that she was in fact highly intelligent. Rubin's dialogue is narrated by actress Julianna Margulies.

== Production ==
The film was produced and directed by Gerardine Wurzburg and co-produced by the CNN cable network. It aired as part of the series CNN Presents. Douglas Biklen, the director of the Facilitated Communication Institute, was a co-producer.

== Criticism ==
Autism researchers such as Gina Green of San Diego State University have criticized the film for its positive portrayal of facilitated communication. Green stated that making a film without "even a hint, much less a disclosure" of the evidence against facilitated communication "is appalling". Ann M. Donnellan and Martha R. Leary's 2012 book "Autism: Sensory-Movement Differences and Diversity" mentions Lisa Barrett Mann's 2005 article as a "troubling example of misinformed skepticism". The 2005 article by Lisa Barrett Mann is Autism Is a World is described as a propaganda film for the pseudoscience facilitated communication in a report of the magazine Slate.

The Behavior Analysis Association of Michigan (BAAM) pointed out that although Sue Rubin has 2q37 deletion syndrome, which causes handicaps like skeleton malformations and severe developmental disabilities, this issue is not mentioned in the film. In addition, there is skepticism that Rubin has an IQ of 133, as she cannot perform simple tasks independently, needs 24-hour care and only has the articulation skills of a two to three-year-old child. The Nancy Lurie Marks Foundation, which is a supporter of the Facilitated Communication Institute, gave away 16,000 free copies of the film to public libraries in the United States to promote facilitated communication. CNN supported the campaign for the pseudoscience of supported communication through ad-free broadcasting of the documentary in schools.

== Literature ==
- Behinderungsmodelle in: Franziska Felder: Inklusion und Gerechtigkeit: Das Recht behinderter Menschen auf Teilhabe, Campus Verlag, 2012, p. 61 & 62

== Publishing ==
- The film was released on DVD in June 2005.

== See also ==
- Autism spectrum disorders in the media
- List of films about autism
- Rapid Prompting Method
