= Adolf Meyer (psychiatrist) =

Swiss-American psychiatrist (1866–1950)

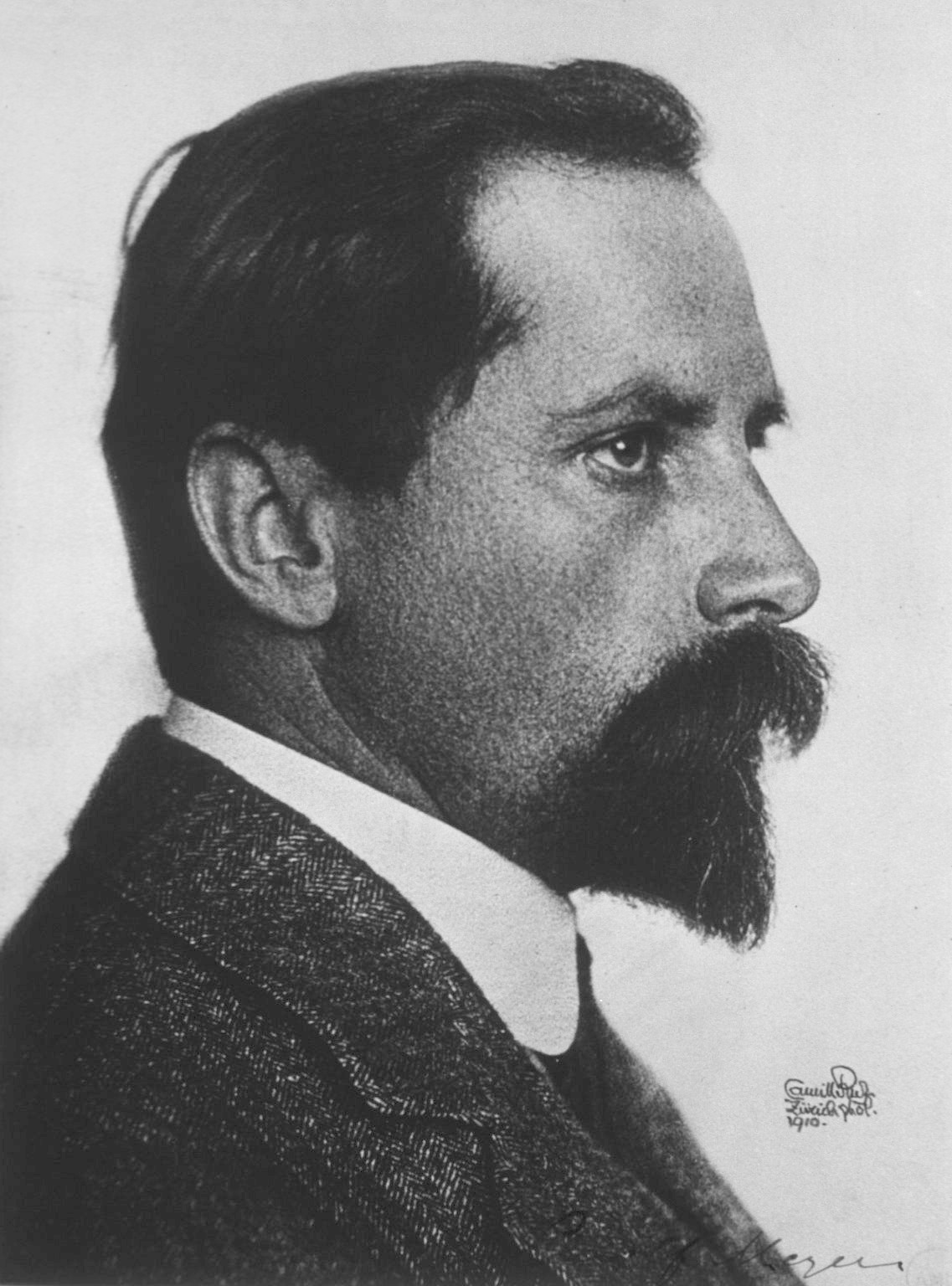
- Meyer in 1910
- Born: September 13, 1866; Niederweningen, Switzerland
- Died: March 17, 1950 (aged 83); Baltimore, Maryland, U.S.
- Resting place: Druid Ridge Cemetery; Pikesville, Maryland, U.S.
- Citizenship: American
- Education: University of Zurich
- Scientific career
- Fields: Psychiatry
- Doctoral advisor: Auguste Forel

Signature
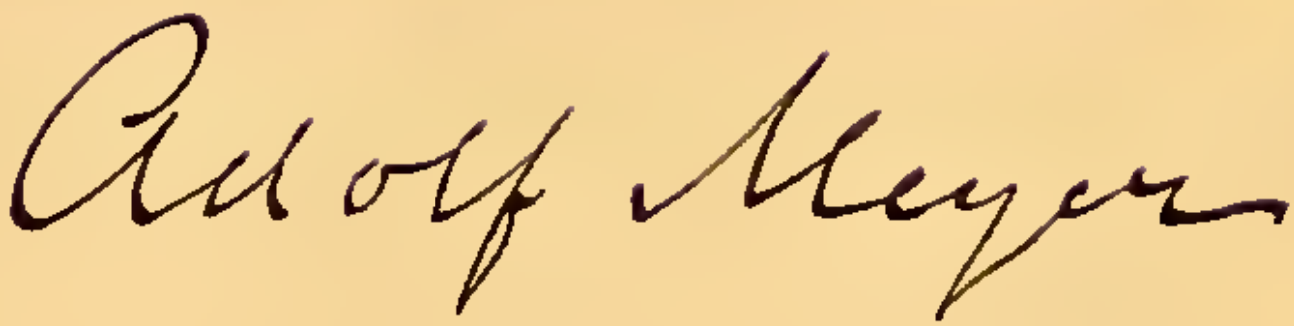

Adolf Meyer (September 13, 1866 – March 17, 1950) was a Swiss-born psychiatrist who rose to prominence as the first psychiatrist-in-chief of the Johns Hopkins Hospital (1910–1941). He was president of the American Psychiatric Association in 1927–28 and was one of the most influential figures in psychiatry in the first half of the twentieth century. His focus on collecting detailed case histories on patients was one of the most prominent of his contributions. He oversaw the construction and development of the Henry Phipps Psychiatric Clinic at Johns Hopkins Hospital, which opened in April 1913, ensuring it was suitable for scientific research, training, and treatment. Meyer's work at the Phipps Clinic is possibly the most significant aspect of his career.

Meyer's main theoretical contribution was his idea of ergasiology (a term he derived from the Greek for "working" and "doing") to describe psychobiology. This brought together all the biological, social, and psychological factors and symptoms pertaining to a patient. He considered mental illnesses to be a product of dysfunctional personality, not a pathology of the brain. Believing that whole-life social and biological factors should be central to both diagnosis and treatment, Meyer was one of the earliest psychiatrists to support occupational therapy as an important connection between the activities of an individual and their mental health, and incorporated community-based activities and services to develop people's everyday living skills.

== Personal life and education ==
Adolf Meyer was born in Niederweningen, Switzerland, in 1866. He was the son of a Zwinglian pastor. Meyer received his MD from the University of Zurich in 1892, where he studied neurology under Auguste Forel. During his time at the university, he studied abroad in Paris, London and Edinburgh, working under John Hughlings Jackson and Jean-Martin Charcot. His doctorate thesis was published in 1892 and had to do with the reptilian forebrain. Unable to secure an appointment with the university, he emigrated to the United States in 1892. Meyer married Mary Potter Brooks, of Newburgh, New York, on September 15, 1902. They had one daughter, Julia Lathrup Meyer, on February 14, 1916. Meyer died on March 17, 1950, at his home at 4305 Rugby Road in Baltimore, Maryland, of a heart attack. He was buried in Druid Ridge Cemetery in Pikesville, Maryland.

== Medical career ==
=== Early career ===
After moving to the United States, Meyer first practiced neurology and taught at the University of Chicago, where he was exposed to the ideas of the Chicago functionalists. He was unable to find a paid, full-time post at the University of Chicago, so his time there was short-lived, serving from 1892 to 1895. From 1893 to 1895, he served as pathologist at the new Kankakee State Hospital, Illinois, after which he worked at the state hospital at Worcester, Massachusetts, from 1895 to 1902, all the while publishing papers prolifically in neurology, neuropathology, and psychiatry. He also served as docent at Clark University.

=== Time in New York ===
In 1902, he became director of the Pathological Institute of the New York State Hospital system (shortly afterwards given its present name, New York State Psychiatric Institute), and in the next few years, he shaped much of American psychiatry by emphasizing the importance of keeping detailed patient records and by introducing both Emil Kraepelin's classificatory system and Sigmund Freud's ideas. While in the New York State Hospital system, Meyer was one of the first importers of Freud's ideas about the importance of both sexuality and the formative influence of early rearing on the adult personality. Meyer found many of Freud's ideas and therapeutic methods insightful and useful, but he rejected psychoanalysis as a wholesale etiological explanation of mental disorders in favor of his own theory of psychobiology. He never practiced psychoanalysis and always kept it at arm's length from Johns Hopkins because of Freud's increasingly dogmatic insistence on the psychical causation of mental illnesses. As he wrote in his presidential address to the 84th Annual Meeting of the American Psychiatric Association: "Those who imagine that all psychiatry and psychopathology and therapy have to resolve themselves into a smattering of claims and hypotheses of psychoanalysis and that they stand or fall with one's feelings about psychoanalysis, are equally misguided". Meyer was Professor of Psychiatry at Cornell University from 1904 to 1909.

=== The Phipps Clinic at Johns Hopkins ===
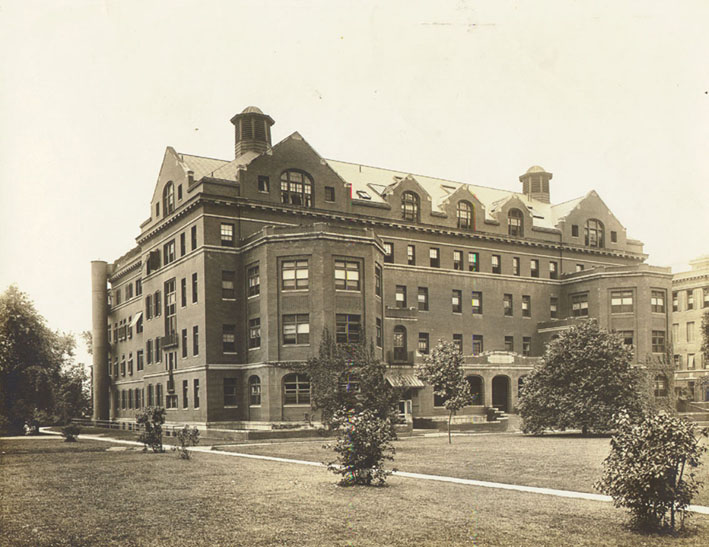
The Henry Phipps Psychiatric Clinic at Johns Hopkins

In 1908, Meyer was asked to become the director of a new psychiatric clinic at the Johns Hopkins Hospital after Henry Phipps, Jr. donated 1.5 million dollars to open the clinic. Meyer accepted the offer, which he described as "the most important professorship [in psychiatry] in the English-speaking domain." He oversaw the building and development of the clinic and made sure the building was suitable for scientific research, training and treatment. The Henry Phipps Psychiatric Clinic opened in April 1913.

Meyer's work at the Phipps Clinic is arguably the most significant aspect of his career. His model for the Phipps Clinic combined clinical and laboratory work, which was the first time these elements were combined in a mental institute in the United States. Although the Phipps Clinic did not use the clinical model of Emil Kraepelin, Meyer did incorporate some of Kraepelin's practices into the clinic. These practices include extensive observations of the patients and studying both the presymptomatic and remissive phases of mental illness, along with periods of acute illness.

Meyer also served as a professor of psychiatry at Johns Hopkins School of Medicine from 1910 to 1941. In his beginning years at Johns Hopkins, Meyer helped oversee the work of a few of his aspiring students. Phyllis Greenacre, from the University of Chicago, and Curt Richter, a Harvard graduate, both had the opportunity to study under Meyer. Most notably, Richter studied the behavior of rats with Meyer and John B. Watson, a behavioral psychologist. Meyer worked at Johns Hopkins until his retirement in 1941. Meyer also conducted a nine-month study of the brain of Giuseppe Zangara, assassin who shot President Franklin Roosevelt and killed Mayor Anton Cermak.

== Legacy ==
=== Honors and awards ===
Meyer received honorary degrees from Glasgow University in 1901, Clark University in 1909, Yale University in 1934 and Harvard University in 1942. In 1942, Meyer was awarded the Thomas Salmon Medal for distinguished service in psychiatry.

In 1938, the neuropsychiatric clinic at Rhode Island State Hospital for Mental Diseases was named after Meyer.

=== People ===
Many of Meyer's students went on to make significant contributions to American psychiatry or psychoanalysis, though not necessarily as Meyerians. Most of the founders of the New York Psychoanalytic Society had worked under Meyer at Manhattan State Hospital, including its chief architect Abraham Arden Brill, and Charles Macfie Campbell.

Meyer and William Henry Welch played an instrumental role in Clifford Beers' founding of the Connecticut Society for Mental Hygiene in 1908. Under Meyer's direction, Leo Kanner founded the first child psychiatry clinic in the United States at the Johns Hopkins Hospital in 1930.

=== Contributions to psychology ===
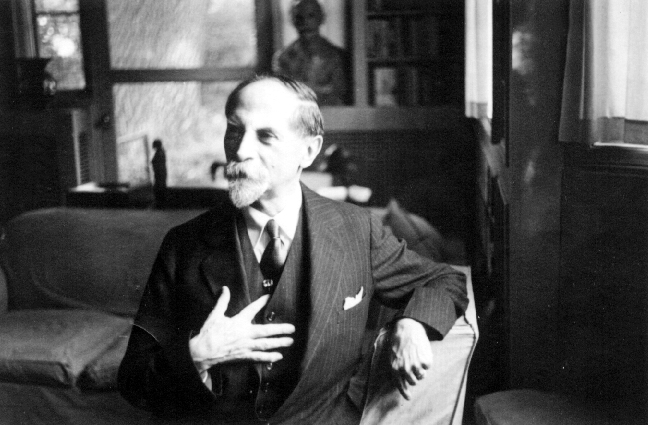
Adolf Meyer

Meyer's main contribution was in his ideas of psychobiology, where he focused on addressing all biological, social and psychological factors and symptoms pertaining to a patient. Meyer coined the term "ergasiology", which has Greek roots for "working" and "doing", as another way to classify psychobiology. One of his ideas was that mental illnesses were a product of a dysfunctional personality and not from the pathology of the brain. He also stressed the idea that social and biological factors that affect someone throughout their entire life should be heavily considered when diagnosing and treating a patient. Another contribution of Meyer was that he was one of the earlier psychologists that supported occupational therapy. He thought there was an important connection between the activities of an individual and their mental health. Taking this into consideration he looked for community based activities and services to aid people with everyday living skills.

Meyer was a strong believer in the importance of empiricism, and advocated repeatedly for a scientific, and, particularly, a biological approach to understanding mental illness. He hoped that the Phipps Clinic would help put mental illness on the same ground as every other human illness. He insisted that patients could best be understood through consideration of their "psychobiological" life situations. He reframed mental disease as biopsychosocial "reaction types" rather than as biologically specifiable natural disease entities. In 1906, he reframed dementia praecox as a "reaction type", a discordant bundle of maladaptive habits that arose as a response to biopsychosocial stressors.

Meyer was also involved with the Eugenics Records Office, which he viewed as a natural extension of the mental hygiene movement which he helped to create. He served on the advisory council of the American Eugenics Society for 12 years, from 1923 to 1935. Meyer's views on eugenics have not yet been studied closely and his association with the Eugenics Record Office cannot be equated straightforwardly with the extremism of some eugenicists, especially in light of the fact that the fundamental premise of Meyerian psychobiology contradicted the genetic determinism that underpinned scientific racism in the first half of the twentieth century.

Meyer had oversight over Henry Cotton, who ran a psychiatric hospital which regularly extracted the teeth and organs from patients, resulting in about a 45% death rate. Cotton believed that nearly all psychiatric problems could be resolved through the complete removal of teeth and subjected hundreds of patients to this treatment, over their objections and resistance. Although Meyer knew that Cotton's psychiatric hospital was a torture chamber, he actively prevented news of this from reaching the general public and praised Cotton publicly while burying investigations by other doctors. In Madhouse: A Tragic Tale of Megalomania and Modern Medicine, Andrew Scull faults Meyer for this decision.

=== Contributions to Occupational Therapy ===
Adolf Meyer was a significant figure who shaped the philosophical basis of occupational therapy. At Johns Hopkins, Meyer collaborated with Eleanor Clarke Slagle, who he later appointed as Director of Occupational Therapy. Slagle would become one of OT's most influential leaders, manifesting Meyer's philosophy by creating training programs and structured therapeutic activities. Together, their work moved occupational therapy beyond diversional activity and into a recognized medical discipline. Meyer's most influential contribution came in 1921, when he delivered his keynote address at the National Society for the Promotion of Occupational Therapy. In this speech, later called: The Philosophy of Occupational Therapy, he emphasized the balance of work, rest, play, and social participation as essential to health. This concept not only unified the early profession but continues to guide occupational therapy practice today.

=== Publications ===
Meyer never published a textbook. Between 1890 and 1943, he published roughly 400 articles in scientific and academic journals, mostly in English, but also in his native German and in French. Most were published together after his death in 1950 in four bound volumes called The Collected Papers of Adolf Meyer.

- The Collected Papers of Adolf Meyer (Baltimore: Johns Hopkins University Press, 1951)
- The Anatomical Facts and Clinical Varieties of Traumatic Insanity (1904)
- The Nature and Conception of Dementia Praecox (1910)
- Constructive Formulation of Schizophrenia (1922)

== Notes ==
- Guide to The Adolf Meyer Collection at http://www.medicalarchives.jhmi.edu; a Guide to the personal papers collection of Adolf Meyer at The Alan Mason Chesney Medical Archives of the Johns Hopkins Medical Institutions with a short biography and timeline
