= The Henry Phipps Psychiatric Clinic =

Defunct psychiatric school and clinic in Baltimore, Maryland

Phipps Clinic
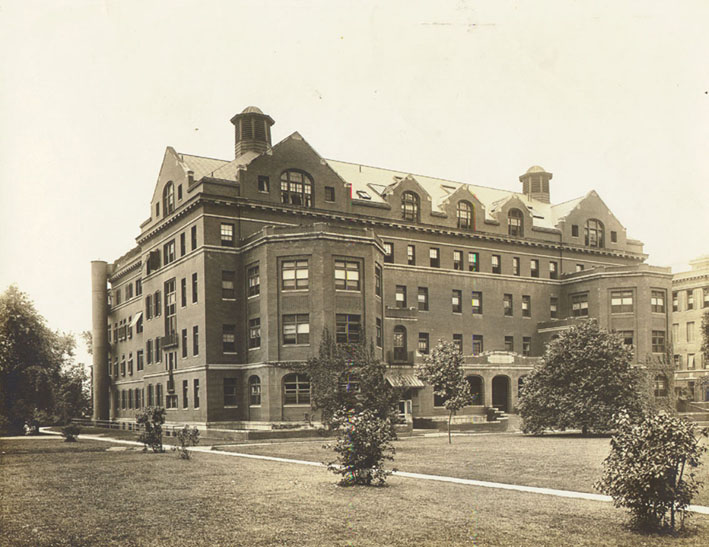
- Outside view of the clinic

General information
- Status: Closed
- Location: 1800 Orleans St, Baltimore, Maryland, United States
- Opened: April 16, 1913

The Henry Phipps Psychiatric Clinic is a psychiatric school and clinic in Baltimore, Maryland. Proposed in 1908 as the first of its kind in the United States, the clinic opened on April 16, 1913 as a new section of Johns Hopkins Hospital. After a visit to the hospital to check on his other investments in the Phipps Tuberculosis Dispensary, Henry Phipps decided to donate $1.5 million to fund psychiatry at Johns Hopkins. William Welch, dean of the Johns Hopkins School of Medicine, quickly appointed Adolf Meyer as the director of the clinic, a renowned psychiatrist at the time.

== Development ==
Before the founding of the Phipps Psychiatric Clinic in Baltimore, Maryland, patients with severe mental disorders often went to Bellevue Hospital in New York City and to the Blockley Hospital in Philadelphia, Pennsylvania. Because there were only a few locations treating mental disorders, medical students did not have many opportunities to study psychiatry in the United States. Germany was at the forefront of psychological studies and treatments, but Dr. William Welch of the Johns Hopkins Hospital looked to change that by educating the public through a national campaign against mental ill health.

=== Founding ===
The interior of the Phipps Clinic

On a routine visit to check on his investments in the Tuberculosis Clinic, philanthropist Henry Phipps asked Dr. William Welch if there were any other departments that needed assistance. A book called A Mind That Found Itself by Clifford Whittingham Beers inspired Welch to request an investment so Johns Hopkins could become a leader in psychiatry. Phipps agreed to donate $1.5 million to start the Henry Phipps Psychiatric Clinic at the Johns Hopkins Hospital. A man named Adolf Meyer, a prominent professor of psychiatry at Cornell University and the first ever psychobiologist, helped publish A Mind That Found Itself and was one of the best in the field of psychiatry, so Welch recruited Meyer to become the head of the new department. Meyer became the head of the department in 1909 and oversaw the development of both the department and the building that would house the clinic for the next few decades. After several years of construction, the clinic finally opened on April 16, 1913.

=== Operations ===
In between the years 1914–1917, the 1,897 patients admitted reflected a wide range of cultural and economic diversity. This resulted from the clinic's mission and expectation to serve the urban and impoverished population surrounding it. Forty-nine percent of its patients were local, a process facilitated by the clinic's outpatient dispensary. Invited by Meyer to join the clinic, William Horsely Gantt came over from Ivan Petrovich Pavlov's laboratory in Leningrad and became the founder and the director of the Pavlovian Laboratory from 1930 to 1964. Gantt initiated a program investigating the nervous disturbances in dogs by combining a physiological method with a psychiatric problem. By the time Meyer retired, the old procedures such as frontal lobotomy and insulin shocks became outdated and new techniques began to emerge. Under each new director, the clinic maintained the overall philosophy of a behavioral approach to psychiatry while also incorporating the modern advancements such as psychopharmacology. The clinic has revolutionized the Western view of psychology by adopting novel models based on evolutionary principles over the years.

== Notable faculty ==
=== Directors ===
- Adolf Meyer (1909-1941)
- John C. Whitehorn (1941-1960)
- Jerome Frank (1960-1961)
- Seymour S. Kety (1961-1962)
- Joel Elkes (1965-1973)
- Paul McHugh (1975-2001)
- William Breakey (1992-1993)
- J. Raymond DePaulo Jr. (2002–2016)
- James Bennett Potash (2017–present)

=== Notable faculty ===
- Adolf Meyer
- Curt Richter
- W. Horsley Gantt
- Jerome Frank
- Leo Kanner
- Eugene Meyer
- Joseph Brady
- Solomon Snyder
- Paul McHugh
- Marshal and Susan Folsteirn
- Kay Redfield Jamison
- John Money
- Ghislaine D. Godenne
