= Leo Kanner =

Austrian-American physician and psychiatrist

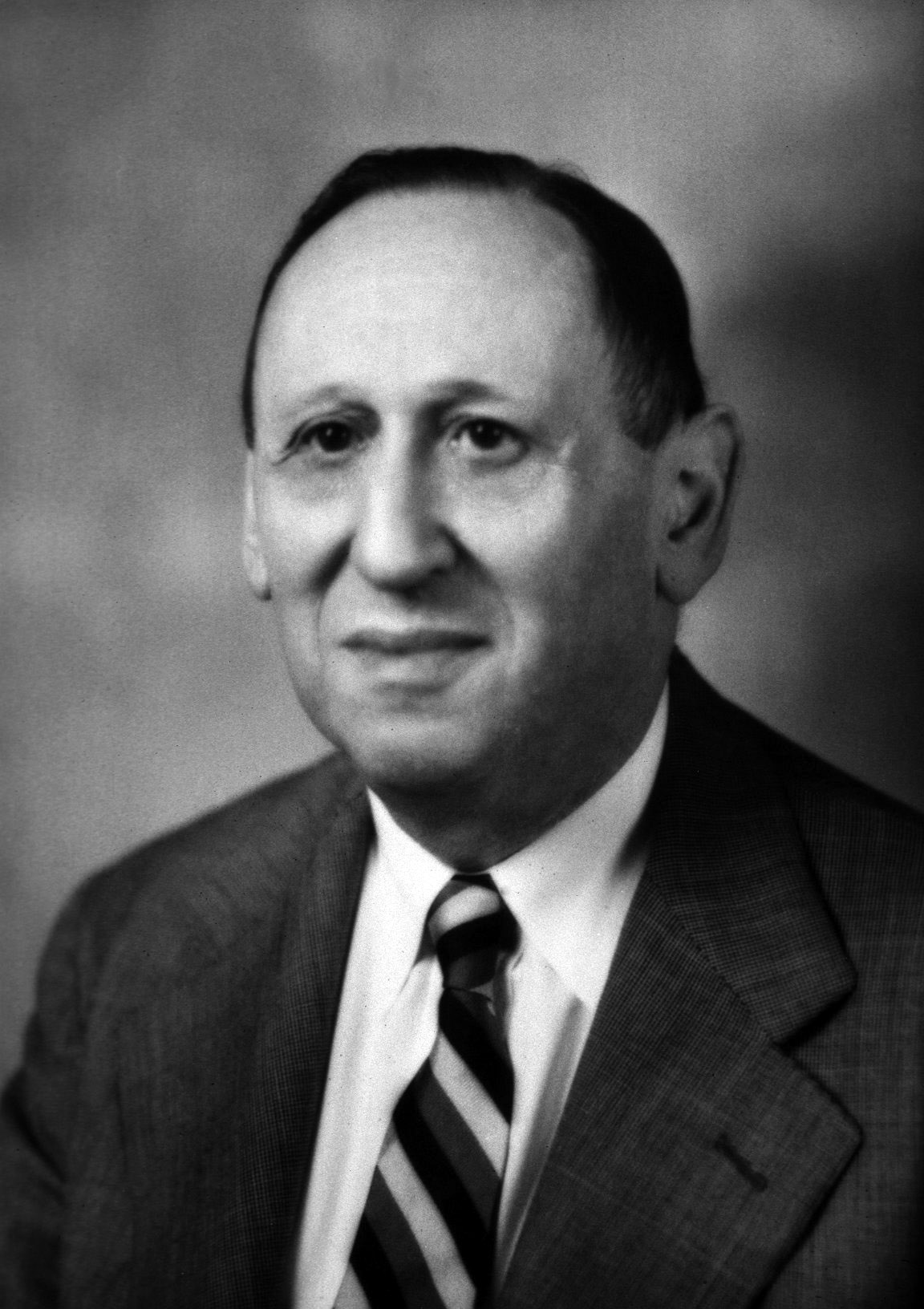
- Kanner, ca. 1955
- Born: Chaskel Leib Kanner; June 13, 1894; Klekotów, Austro-Hungary
- Died: April 3, 1981 (aged 86); Sykesville, Maryland, United States
- Medical career
- Profession: Physician
- Field: Psychiatry
- Institutions: Johns Hopkins Hospital, Johns Hopkins School of Medicine
- Sub-specialties: Child & Adolescent Psychiatry
- Research: Autism spectrum disorder
- Notable works: Autistic Disturbances of Affective Contact (1943)

Leo Kanner (/ˈkænər/; born Chaskel Leib Kanner, German: [ˈkanɐ]; June 13, 1894 – April 3, 1981) was an Austrian-American psychiatrist, physician, and social activist best known for his work related to infantile autism. Before working at the Henry Phipps Psychiatric Clinic at the Johns Hopkins Hospital, Kanner practiced as a physician in Germany and South Dakota. In 1943, Kanner published his landmark paper Autistic Disturbances of Affective Contact, describing 11 children who displayed "a powerful desire for aloneness" and "an obsessive insistence on persistent sameness." He named their condition "early infantile autism". Kanner was in charge of developing the first child psychiatry clinic in the United States and later served as the Chief of Child Psychiatry at the Johns Hopkins Hospital. He is one of the co-founders of The Children's Guild, a nonprofit organization serving children, families and child-serving organizations throughout Maryland and Washington, D.C., and dedicated to "Transforming how America Cares for and Educates its Children and Youth." He is widely considered one of the most influential American psychiatrists of the 20th century.

== Biography ==
=== Early life ===
Leo Kanner was born as Chaskel Leib Kanner in Klekotów, Austro-Hungarian Monarchy (present day Klekotiv, Ukraine) on June 13, 1894, to Abraham Kanner and Clara Reisfeld Kanner. In this area, approximately 70% of the total population was of Jewish descent. Kanner despised his given names, "Chaskel", which is the Yiddish version of "Ezekiel", and "Leib", instead choosing to go by "Leo". Growing up in a traditional Jewish household, Kanner received both a religious and a secular education. Kanner spent the first years of his life in Klekotów with his family and was brought up according to Jewish tradition and custom.

In 1906, Kanner was sent to Berlin to live with his uncle. Later, the rest of his family followed. At a young age, Kanner appreciated the arts and wanted to pursue a career as a poet; unfortunately, he was not able to get his works published. In 1913, Kanner graduated from the Sophien-Gymnasium, a public state high school in Berlin, where he excelled in the sciences. He then passed the graduating Staatsexamen exam in 1919 and enrolled at the University of Berlin medical school. However, Kanner's medical education was interrupted during World War I, when he was recruited to serve in the Austro-Hungarian Army in the medical service of the 10th Infantry Regiment. After the war, Kanner went back to medical school in Berlin and officially received his medical degree in 1921. Later that year, Kanner married June Lewin, with whom he would eventually have two children: Anita (born in 1923) and Albert (born in 1931).

=== Early career ===
After graduating medical school, Kanner worked as a cardiologist at the Charité Hospital in Berlin. Kanner began doing work with normal heart sound to the relationship of the electrocardiogram. At that time, the atmosphere at the Charité clinics and institutes inspired rapid progress in science, teaching and patient care. The Charité, situated in the middle of Berlin, attracted students, physicians and scientists from all over the world, resulting in a group of outstanding personalities and renowned clinicians.

Motivated by the post-war hyperinflation and poor economic conditions of Weimar Germany, Kanner immigrated to the United States in 1924. If he had stayed in Germany his fate might have been similar to other Jewish professionals who lost their lives during the war. He stated: "Little did I know, if I had remained in Germany I would have been perished by Hitler in the Holocaust".

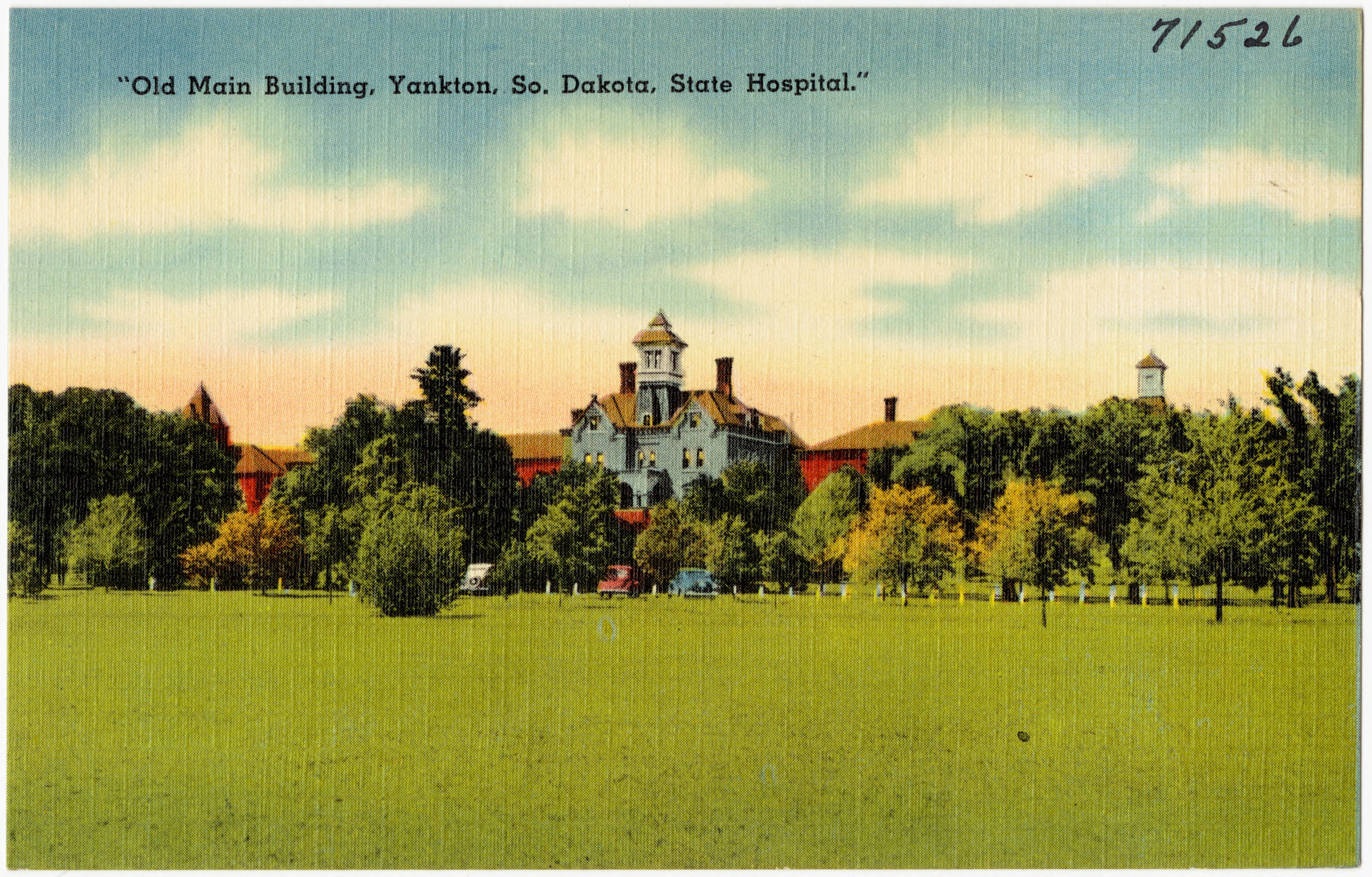
Yankton State Hospital in Yankton, South Dakota

When he emigrated to the United States in 1924, he worked at the state hospital in Yankton, South Dakota, where he started his pediatric and psychiatric studies. Upon arrival, Kanner was appointed assistant physician at the Yankton State Hospital. It was there Kanner would learn the subtleties of pediatrics and psychiatry, two fields in which he was not experienced. To enhance his command of the English language, Kanner did the crossword puzzles in The New York Times. During his time in South Dakota, Kanner published his first works, which were on general paralysis and syphilis. Kanner also studied the effects of adrenalin on the blood pressure of patients with functional paralysis. Additionally, he published his first book, Folklore of the Teeth, an analysis of dental practices around the world in relation to customs and folklore, in 1928.

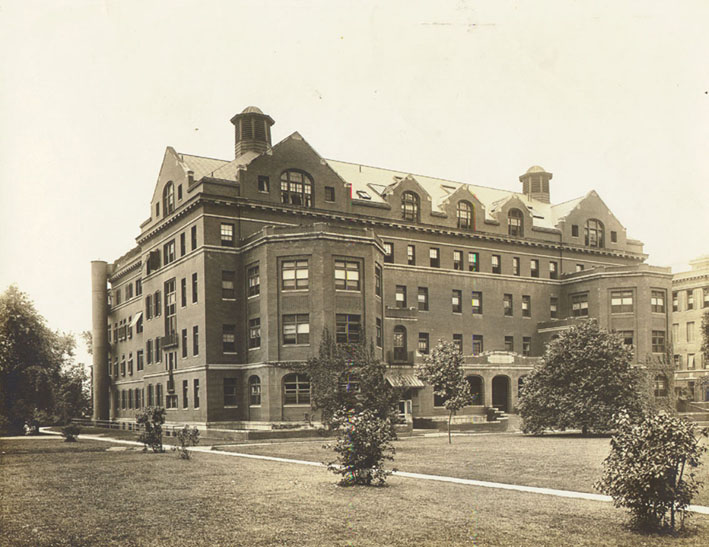
The Henry Phipps Psychiatric Clinic at the Johns Hopkins Hospital

=== Career at the Johns Hopkins University and Johns Hopkins Hospital ===
After serving four years in South Dakota, Kanner attained a fellowship position at the Henry Phipps Psychiatric Clinic at the Johns Hopkins Hospital in Baltimore, Maryland in 1928, after attracting the attention of Adolf Meyer who was the Psychiatrist-in-Chief and Director of the psychiatric clinic. In 1930, with monetary support from the Macy and Rockefeller Foundations, Meyer and Edward A. Park were able to establish the Children's Psychiatry Service at the Harriet Lane Home at Johns Hopkins, which was the first child psychiatry clinic in the United States, and appointed Kanner to develop the program. Despite his inexperience in the fields of pediatrics and child psychiatry, Kanner was able to teach himself pediatric psychiatry. In 1933, Meyer promoted Kanner to associate professor of psychiatry at Johns Hopkins University. In 1935 the first edition of his textbook, Child Psychiatry was published. This was the first English language textbook on child psychiatry.

Beyond his revolutionary clinical research, Kanner's concern for the mentally ill manifested as social activism for which he is also remembered today. In the 1930s, a group of lawyers and judges arranged for 166 state-institutionalized, mentally ill residents to be released and assigned as unpaid domestic servants for affluent families around Baltimore. The release of these patients was justified through the Habeas Corpus writs and the claim to familial rights. Out of his own concern, Kanner decided to track down the 166 patients and found them plagued with a variety of dreadful outcomes such as STDs, tuberculosis, prostitution, imprisonment, institutionalization, and even death. Kanner reported that the 166 released patients had a total of 165 children, many of whom became orphans or died due to neglect. Kanner's report on these patients, "Scheme to Get Morons to Work in Homes Free Charged", made the headlines of The Baltimore Sun and The Washington Post in 1938. The publicity helped spark community action and led to the better treatment of the mentally ill. Apart from his social activism for the mentally ill, during the run-up to World War II, Kanner was instrumental in rescuing hundreds of Jewish physicians from the horrors of the Nazis by relocating them to work in the United States. He and his wife opened their home to many of these European refugees.

Beginning in 1938, Kanner observed eleven of his patients and chronicled the lives and behavioral characteristics of the children in his seminal paper, "Autistic Disturbances of Affective Contact", published in 1943. In this landmark publication, Kanner describes these children, all born in the 1930s, as living very disparate lives, but appearing to share something he labeled as "infantile autism", which is now simply known as autism. Later on, Kanner served as the Chief of Child Psychiatry at Johns Hopkins until his retirement from the position in 1959 and attaining the position of Emeritus. He was replaced by Leon Eisenberg. After retirement, Kanner continued to publish papers regarding autism until 1973. Moreover, he served as a visiting professor at Stanford University, the University of Wisconsin, and the University of Minnesota, and ran an active consulting practice until a few years before his passing.

== Research ==
=== Studies of autism ===
Kanner expressed a great deal of concern about the usual mistreatment of neurodivergent children. He expressed concern about a society where 'intellectual haves' look down on the 'intellectual have-nots', which led many to look down on the child with intellectual disability as an object of adult manipulations rather than as a human being who reacts to affection and hostility, to acceptance and rejection, to approval and disapproval, to patience and irritability as any other child would. This led to his major work in 1943, "Autistic Disturbances of Affective Contact", published in 1943. In this paper, Kanner characterizes eleven cases, 3 girls and 8 boys, and would later call his observations 'autism'.

==== Autistic Disturbances of Affective Contact (1943) ====
Published in the journal Nervous Child, "Autistic Disturbances of Affective Contact" was one of the most cited papers on autism in the twentieth century. In his landmark paper, Kanner took the term "autism", which Eugen Bleuler previously attributed to the inward, introspective symptoms typical in adult schizophrenia patients, and labeled the eleven children in his study as having "infantile autism." However, rather than relating his observations to the qualities and symptoms seen in schizophrenic adults, Kanner classified his description of "autism" to be independent from the psychotic disorder of schizophrenia, explaining how autism was not a precursor to schizophrenia, and that the symptoms of autism appeared evident and present at birth and early life. A significant work, this paper on "Kanner Syndrome" formed the basis for later research conducted by Kanner and others on what later became known as childhood autism spectrum disorder.

From 1938, Kanner began to study a group of eleven young children (eight boys and three girls) who came to see him at his clinic at the Johns Hopkins Hospital. For each of the cases, Kanner provides a detailed account of the symptoms, health, results of diagnostic tests, familial background, and future development and progression of the children. Adding to his own observations, Kanner further contextualized the lives of his patients by including typically epistolary inputs from family members and other individuals with whom the children interacted. Generally, all of the children shared certain core symptoms and came from similar socioeconomic and cultural backgrounds (all but two of the families were of Anglo-Saxon descent). The following are summaries of each of the eleven cases:

1. Donald T.: Born on September 8, 1933, Donald Triplett was first seen in October, 1938 when he was five years old. At birth, Donald was healthy, with his only complication being eating, which according to an account from his father, "has always been a problem with him. He has never shown a normal appetite." From an early age, Donald demonstrated "an unusual memory for face and names" and "could hum and sing many tunes accurately", being able to memorize phrases that rhymed or were of a similar nature. Donald's parents observed that "he was happiest when left alone", neither paying much attention to anyone in the room nor reacting to the absence or homecoming of his mother or father. What amused him was spinning round objects, such as pans and spinning blocks, but he was afraid of "self-propelling vehicles", like tricycles and swings. Donald had erupted into destructive, terrible temper tantrums when he was disrupted. At his first meeting with Kanner, Donald was observed shaking his head from side-to-side, repeating the same three-note tune, spinning anything he could get his hands on, and organizing objects by color, much to his own merriment. Most of his actions were repetitious, "carried out in exactly the same way in which they had been performed originally." Often, he would utter random words of phrases, and this formed much of his verbal output and speech. Another problem Donald had with language was his understanding of the meaning of words. Words had a "literal, inflexible meaning" to Donald, and he was unable to recognize and apply the denotation of a word to another context; each word had a definite, designated definition and association in his mind. For the most part, conversations with Donald consisted of a barrage of questions. Finally, Kanner noted that the relationship Donald had with others was of a nature insofar as when he needed or wanted to know about something.
2. Frederick W.: An only child of two university graduates, Frederick was born May 23, 1936, in breech position and was referred to see Kanner in 1942 at the age of six. Described as being "self-sufficient", Frederick was capable of entertaining himself happily and was easily absorbed by objects, demonstrating "good attention and perseverance" in playing with toys. In turn, he paid little attention to other people, viewing them as "unwelcome intruders", ignoring them as much as possible in order to maintain his attention to his playthings. Furthermore, Frederick feared mechanical objects, such as vacuum cleaners and egg beaters, even running away at the sight of or hearing the things. Similar to Donald, Frederick liked a regimented lifestyle in which everything had to have been placed and arranged in the same fashion and pattern. Frederick had limited verbal interactions, ejaculating unintelligible sounds and responding to commands in "echolalia fashion", but he was able to sing twenty to thirty songs, including a French lullaby. Due to a lack of cooperation during the Grace Arthur performance scale diagnostic tests, Frederick's results were difficult to evaluate. He performed the best on the Seguin form board, which consisted of inputting variously shaped objects back into their respective form holes on a board, with a best time of 58 seconds. In the mare and foal test, it appeared that he put the pieces in the appropriate places based on their configuration because it did not matter to him whether the pieces were right side up or not. During the form board tests, he was very concentrated and determined, working on them in an interested manner, but between tests, he wandered about the room examining various objects, paying no attention the people in the room.
3. Richard M.: Originally, Richard was referred to Johns Hopkins Hospital at the age of three on suspicion that he was deaf because he did not talk and did not respond to questions. Born on November 17, 1937, Richard was relatively healthy and developed in an ordinary fashion, but his mother noted that in comparing Richard to her younger child, the elder child failed to show any "physiognomic or postural sign of preparedness" when being picked up. It was first observed at the clinic that Richard seemed quite intelligent, "playing with the toys in his bed and being adequately curious about instruments used in the examination." Like the other patients, he was described as being self-sufficient. Richard was deeply focused in active play with toys and did not care for the people in the room. Occasionally, he looked at the walls, smiled, and uttered "Ee! Ee! Ee!" sounds. It was noted that Richard "performed well with the unrotated form board, but not with the rotated form board." Both of the subsequent times he was seen by Kanner, Richard paid little attention to those in his presence, fell into fusses when something was disagreeable with him or when he wanted something, and consistently turned on and off the lights of the rooms once he entered it. Eventually, his mother sent him to a foster home to a woman who was known to have a "remarkable talent for dealing with difficult children", and during his stay, she heard him say his first intelligible words, "Good night."
4. Paul G.: Viewed as feebleminded as a result of his "incoherent speech, inability to conform, and reaction with temper outbursts to any interference", Paul was referred to see Kanner when he was five years old. Paul was noted to have good manual dexterity when performing tasks. Rarely, he responded when spoken to, even when directly addressed, though an energetic "Don't!" caused him to interrupt what he was doing at the moment. There was a distinct difference in the way he interacted with people and objects; when entering a room, Paul directly went after the objects, using them correctly and treating them with special attention, whereas he disregarded people, behaving as if they were not there. In terms of speech, Paul typically uttered words or phrases that were directly related to what he was doing at the time, but he sometimes ejaculated random declarations unrelated to the immediate situation. Paul clearly enunciated, had a good vocabulary, and had a satisfactory understanding of sentence construction and syntax, with the significant exception of the fact that he did not use the first-person pronoun nor his own name when addressing himself. Whenever he made statements pertaining to himself, he referred to himself in the second person as literal reiterations of statements said to him in the past. Although no formal testing was carried out, Kanner concluded that Paul was clearly not feebleminded, given his intelligence.
5. Barbara K.: Born normally on October 30, 1933, Barbara came to the clinic at eight years of age. Verbal expression was limited as she had difficulties with diction and syntax, but she had the phenomenal ability to spell, read, and write. Common with the other children, she was repetitious and obsessive over the order and placement of objects and phrasing. Barbara was very timid and afraid of things that would change, like the wind and large animals. Upon request, she would shake hands and greet others by limply offering her hand, demonstrating a lack of affective contact. During the battery of tests, she was not engrossed because it appeared that the "concept of test, or sharing an experience or situation, seemed foreign to her." On the Binet test, she read excellently, finishing the ten-year Binet fire story in 33 seconds with no errors, but when asked to recall anything from the story she read, Barbara failed to reproduce any from her memory. After repeated questions or commands, she complied almost immediately. Barbara frequently referred to "motor transports" and "piggy-back", and was fascinated with appendages, such as pendulums and smoke stacks. Barbara is also the only child whose mother Kanner did not denigrate.
6. Virginia S.: From an account by another psychologist, Virginia was recorded as being distinct from the other children at the training school she attended because she was neat and tidy, did not interact and play with the other students, and was not deaf, but did not talk. Rather, she spent much of her time amusing herself in her own company by putting picture puzzles together. Notably, her older brother commented on the cold nature of their home life, describing that he and Virginia lived in "a frosty atmosphere" with two inapproachable strangers for parents as both of them did not contribute much to raising the children. When seen in October 1942, Virginia stood "listlessly, looking into space", and sometimes answered questions by muttering "Mamma, baby." Appearing to be self-absorbed, Virginia did not interact with the other children grouped around the piano, seemingly not noticing what was occurring. Kanner mentioned that she had "an intelligent physiognomy", but her eyes lacked any expression.
7. Herbert B.: Thought to have been intellectually disabled and deaf, on account of his failure to interact with others, Herbert was born on November 16, 1937. Herbert was terribly frightened by many mechanical objects and devices, such as running water and gas burners, and became upset when any alterations were made to his routine or accustomed patterns. On his first visit, he was observed to be highly intelligent with a good motor coordination. Completely absorbed in whatever he did, with great difficulty could Herbert be distracted from his self-chosen tasks at hand, and when interfered, he would get annoyed by shoving intruders away or screaming. In later visits, he continued to not communicate verbally and entered the room paying no attention to the people present. Never seen smiling, Herbert would occasionally produce unintelligible sounds in a "monotonous singsong manner." Herbert also had an elder sister, Dorothy, whose behavior in early childhood indicates that she too was autistic.
8. Alfred L.: Noted by his mother to develop a specialized interest that would consume his whole day and to prefer to be a "lone wolf", Alfred was born in May 1932 and was brought to see Kanner at three and a half years old. Entering the office, he paid no attention to the examiner, instead immediately going towards the toys in the room and getting absorbed by play with the toy train. A Binet test was attempted on Alfred, and it was initially difficult, but he finally complied in a manner which Kanner assessed as being indicative of Alfred wanting to get through with the intrusion; he achieved an I.Q. of 140. Later on, he began to play with children younger than he was, but continued to be fully immersed in his play and was fearful of mechanical sounds. In terms of speech, he was very specific with his definition of terms and was often confused by the meaning of words.
9. Charles N.: Charles was brought to the clinic on February 2, 1943, at four and a half years of age. When he entered the examination room, he did not pay any attention to the people in the room. On the Seguin form board, he was interested with the name of each of the pieces before putting them in the appropriate holes. In a repetitious pattern, he spun the forms and reacted excitedly when they were spinning. In terms of language, he did not use it to communicate with others, but had a good memory for the names of numerous objects.
10. John F.: Born September 19, 1937, John had difficulty in feeding and appeared to be slow in development. At the office, he wandered about the room aimlessly, but did not bring two objects into relation with each other. When interacting with objects, he was destructive with them, throwing them onto the ground. Unlike most of the other children observed, John had a pretty good command of language, being able to form elaborate and grammatically correct sentences, with the exceptions of using the second pronoun when he referred to himself and being unable to make comparisons between two things. Markedly obsessive, he had a rigid daily routine and had an excellent rote memory, capable of reciting numerous songs, rhymes, and prayers. Furthermore, similar to the other children, words had stiff, designated meanings, as in the case when he asked his father about a group photograph on the wall of the office. Whenever he saw anything broken or incomplete, John would get extremely upset. In December 1942 and January 1943, John had two series of right-sided convulsions, with "conjugate deviation of the eyes to the right and transient paresis of the right arm." The electroencephalogram indicated that there were focal disturbances in the left part of the occipital lobe, but there was difficulty reading the results because of John's lack of cooperation.
11. Elaine C.: Elaine was brought by her parents because of her "unusual development": she had difficulty playing with other children, appearing to be in a world of her own. She was deeply engrossed by all types of animals and would often mimic them by making noises and walking on all fours. Elaine started to talk at around five years old, but she communicated through simple sentences that were "mechanical phrases" typically not related to what was going on at the time. Moreover, she had difficulty with using pronouns properly as well as negatives, but she was able to recognize the meaning of the latter when others used them. Like many of the other patients, she was afraid of moving objects and mechanical sounds, such as that of a vacuum cleaner. In response to questions, she would produce an "echolalia type reproduction" of what was asked.

After profiling each of the patients, in the "Discussion" and "Comment" portions of the paper, Kanner stated that the common characteristics observed in the children formed a "unique syndrome" that may have been more frequent than what was reported at the time given the small sample size in the study.

Kanner indicated that the fundamental issue of this disorder is the children's inability to relate to people and objects in an ordinary way from birth. Distinguishing between the symptoms of the two disorders, Kanner explained that a person with schizophrenia steps outside his or her world and departs from already existing relationships, whereas the children he described had never established such relationships, experiencing an extreme aloneness from very early on. The notion of the innate nature of what Kanner called "extreme aloneness" was evident by recurrent reports of the failure of the children to "assume at any time an anticipatory posture" and adjust their bodies upon being picked up by their parents. The preferences the children had towards solitude manifested in complete disregard and ignorance of any external outputs that may interfere with them, such as direct physical contact, sound, or motion. Regarding the children's lack of interest towards people, Kanner stated that 'it would be best to get these interferences over with, the sooner to be able to return to the still much desired aloneness".

Kanner further noted the centrality of speech disturbances in this neurodivergence, observing that many of the children were delayed in their speech, and that those who did speak often used speech in peculiar ways (e.g., echolalic repetition of phrases and/or inflexible use of language as seen in the exact repetition of pronouns).

Additionally, Kanner observed that the children's behavior was governed by an anxious and obsessive desire for sameness, and that this resulted in their repetitions of actions, such as their verbal utterances, as well as limited spontaneous activity. A related cognitive attribute noted by Kanner was that many of the children had an excellent rote memory, which led their parents to "stuff" them with verse, lists of animal and botanical names, favorite songs, and random facts. Kanner indicated that four of the children had been considered deaf or hard of hearing early on. He also reported early difficulties with eating and suggested that eating may have represented the first intrusion into the children's extreme aloneness. He noted that the children had no particular health difficulties and that their EEG results were normal. He did, however, observe that 5 of the 11 children had relatively large heads, and a few were somewhat clumsy in their gait.

Recounting his observations of the children's families, Kanner noted the high level of intelligence characterizing parents and relatives, while at the same time asserting that there were few warm-hearted parents among the families he observed. He stated his opinion that the marriages of the parents of the children he observed seemed to be "rather cold affairs", but also stated his opinion that the children's autism were "inborn autistic disturbances of affective contact."

=== Other studies ===
Kanner's first research publication, "General Paralysis Among The North American Indians", explored the rarity of general paralytic dementia, a neuropsychiatric disorder that occurs in late-stage syphilis, in the Native Americans he treated at the Yankton State Hospital. In his premier paper, Kanner stated that in what he considered the more "civilized" countries of Europe, there was a higher susceptibility to paralytic dementia from syphilis compared to the "less civilized" Native Americans. Although syphilis was very common amongst the Native Americans, Kanner only came across one patient, Thomas T. Robertson, who was Native American and had symptoms of the late-stage syphilis dementia. Kanner concluded that Native Americans rarely got general paralytic dementia because syphilis had been in their population for so long that it lost the power to produce general paralysis. On the other hand, Kanner argued, syphilis was relatively new to the white populations of Europe so it was more likely to produce general paralysis. However, Kanner believed that with time, the white race could also gain a similar resistance to general paralysis like that of the Native Americans.

In 1949, Kanner published another notable study, "Problems of Nosology and Psychodynamics of Early Infantile Autism*." Kanner explored the issues surrounding "early infantile autism" as it moved from having a well-defined symptomatology to being ready for a place in psychiatric nosology. Kanner focused on how early infantile autism was related and unrelated to the "intrinsic nature" of other conditions such as dementia infantilis and childhood schizophrenia. While early infantile autism and childhood schizophrenia have virtually identical symptoms, Kanner argued that they differ in onset. Prior to the onset of childhood schizophrenia, there is a period of normal mental state. However, early infantile autism manifests itself essentially right after birth. Kanner reported that the babies with early infantile autism were unusually apathetic, did not respond normally to people, did not assume proper posture to be picked up, startled at anything that disrupts their isolation, and lacked responsiveness. Kanner raised doubts about the necessity of separating infantile autism entirely from the schizophrenias because it can be considered as "the earliest possible manifestation of childhood schizophrenia." Unlike his other studies, Kanner decided to focus closely on the adult parents of the children and found something an intriguing pattern. Most of the adult parents had extremely successful careers: scientists, college professors, artists, clergymen, and business executives. In fact, Kanner had trouble finding autistic children of unsophisticated parents. This sparked Kanner's curiosity about the attitudes of the parents and the relationship dynamic between the parents and the children. He found that most of the parents had unaffectionate, mechanical relationships with their autistic children and would oftentimes dismiss them entirely. Kanner concluded that this unaffectionate dynamic potentially causes the autistic children to turn away and "seek comfort in solitude." He even argued that the children's obsessive preoccupations and remarkable memory feats represent "a plea for parental approval," and gave the refrigerator mother hypothesis of autism its start by saying of the children, "They were kept neatly in refrigerators which did not defrost."

== Death and legacy ==
On April 3, 1981, Kanner died of heart failure in Sykesville, Maryland. In his lifetime, Kanner founded the field of child psychiatry and his research contributions laid the foundation for the fields of psychology, pediatrics, autism, and adolescent psychiatry. He is now known as the Father of Child Psychiatry. Kanner was the first physician in the United States to be identified as a child psychiatrist. His textbook, "Child Psychiatry" (1935) was the first English language textbook to focus on the psychiatric problems on children. In 1943, Kanner first described the syndrome of early infantile autism. His concise and cogent clinical descriptions of children with autism continues to inform, and is the standard against which current diagnostic criteria are measured. In his lifetime, Kanner published over 250 articles and eight books spanning the fields of psychiatry, pediatrics, psychology and history of medicine.

Since Kanner's demarcation of childhood autism, research on autism continues to be an area of increasing interest. Although much progress has been made, this field is still in its infancy, and many avenues of research are just beginning to be pursued. Despite the time that has passed, the syndrome Kanner identified and his comments about the children he observed continue to have meaning today, and although some of his suggestions about the etiology and presentation of autism were grounded in the thinking of his day, many of his observations were quite prescient.

Currently, studies of autism focus on the genetic mechanisms that underlie the syndrome. There has been vast research into DNA mutations, epigenetic modifications, and rearrangements that may contribute to the onset of autism. In addition, environmental research, quantitative functional anatomy, and quantitative estimates of gene expression may help us understand "the entire cast of characters" involved in autism. These promising avenues of research heavily stem from Leo Kanner's life research.

In honor of Kanner's work, all Johns Hopkins Child and Adolescent Psychiatry Fellows are now called Kanner Fellows. The Dr. Leo Kanner Award was created by the Mind Research Foundation for those who actively serve children with autism and their families. Now there are numerous buildings, schools, and institutes that honor Leo Kanner both in the United States and abroad.

=== Awards ===
- First Award given by the National Organization for Mentally Ill Children in 1960
- Gutheil Memorial Medal by the Association for the Advancement of Psychotherapy in 1962
- Stanley R. Dean Award by the Fund for Behavioral Sciences in 1965
- Agnes Bruce Greig Award in 1965
- Agnes Purcell McGavin Award by the American Psychiatric Association in 1967
- Citation from the National Society for Autistic Children in 1969
- Salmon Award by New York Academy of Medicine in 1974

== Published works and awards ==
=== Publications ===
==== Papers ====
- Adams GS, Kanner L (1926). "General paralysis among the North American Indians". American Journal of Psychiatry. 83 (1): 125–133. doi:10.1176/ajp.83.1.125.
- Kanner L (1938). "The Paediatric–Psychiatric Alliance". Canadian Medical Association Journal. 38 (1): 71–4. PMC 536313. PMID 20320847.
- Kanner L (1943). "Autistic disturbances of affective contact". The Nervous Child. 2 (4): 217–50. PMID 4880460.
  - Reprinted in Kanner L (1968). "Autistic disturbances of affective contact". Acta Paedopsychiatrica. 35 (4): 100–36. PMID 4880460.
- Kanner L (1949). "Problems of nosology and psychodynamics in early childhood autism". American Journal of Orthopsychiatry. 19 (3): 416–26. doi:10.1111/j.1939-0025.1949.tb05441.x. PMID 18146742.
- Kanner L, Eisenberg L (1956). "Early infantile autism 1943–1955". American Journal of Orthopsychiatry. 26 (3): 556–66. doi:10.1111/j.1939-0025.1956.tb06202.x. PMID 13339939.

==== Books ====
- History of Dentistry Folklore of the Teeth MacMillan Co.(1928)
- Child Psychiatry. (1935).
- In Defense of Mothers. How to Bring Up Children In Spite of the More Zealous Psychologists (1941)
- Childhood Psychosis: Initial Studies and New Insights. (1973).

== Sources ==
Obituaries for Leo Kanner

- Bender L (1982). "In Memoriam Leo Kanner, MD June 13, 1894—April 4, 1981". Journal of the American Academy of Child Psychiatry. 21 (1): 88–89. doi:10.1097/00004583-198201000-00016. PMID 7047620.
- Schopler E, Chess S, Eisenberg L (1981). "Our Memorial to Leo Kanner". Journal of Autism and Developmental Disorders. 11 (3): 257–269. doi:10.1007/bf01531509. PMID 6763610. S2CID 19524683.
- Wilk D (1982). "In memoriam Dr. Leo Kanner, 1894-1981". Korot. 8 (3–4): 213–20. PMID 11630818.
- Eisenberg L (1981). "Leo Kanner, M. D. 1894-1981". The American Journal of Psychiatry. 138 (8): 1122–1125. doi:10.1176/ajp.138.8.1122. PMID 7020437.
- Eisenberg L (1994). "Leo Kanner, 1894-1981". The American Journal of Psychiatry. 151 (5): 751. doi:10.1176/ajp.151.5.751. PMID 8166319.
