= Trenton Psychiatric Hospital =

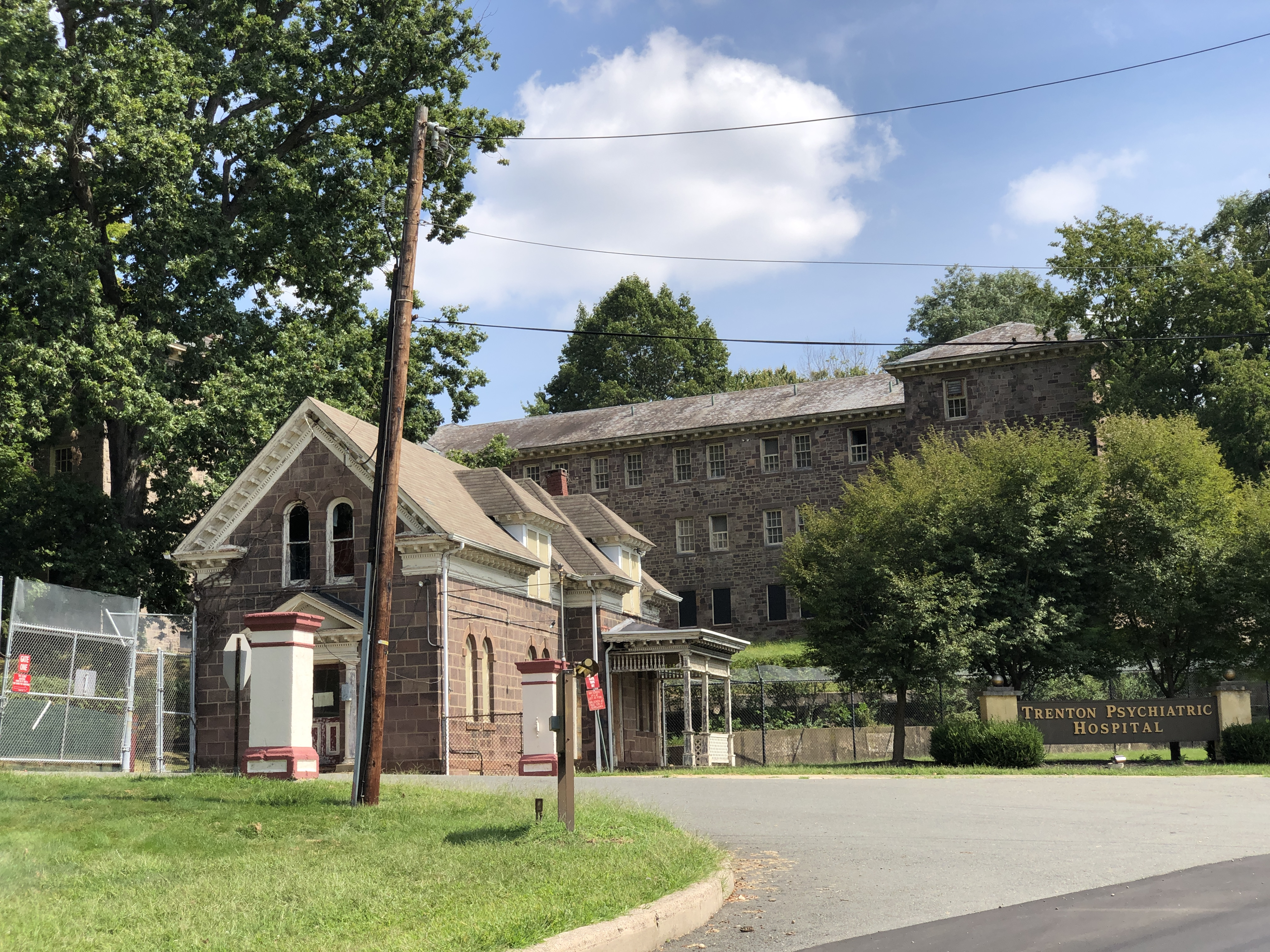
- West entrance to the hospital in 2023

Geography
- Location: Trenton and Ewing Township, New Jersey, New Jersey, United States
- Coordinates: 40.2436°N 74.8055°W

Organization
- Type: Specialty

History
- Opened: May 15, 1848

Links
- Lists: Hospitals in New Jersey

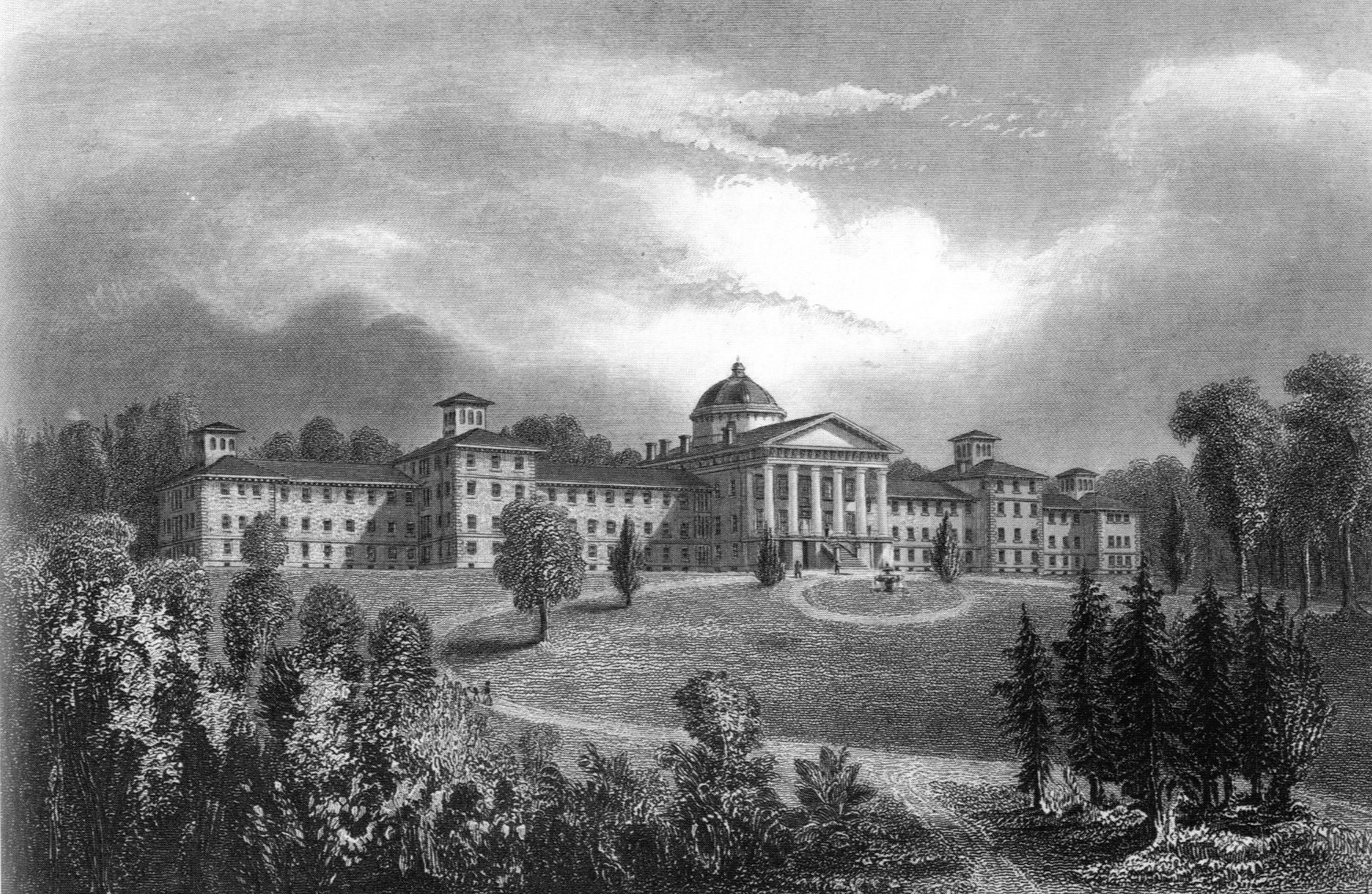
An undated engraving of the hospital from the mid-19th century

The Trenton Psychiatric Hospital is a state run mental hospital located in Trenton and Ewing, New Jersey. It previously operated under the name New Jersey State Hospital at Trenton and originally as the New Jersey State Lunatic Asylum.

Founded by Dorothea Lynde Dix on May 15, 1848, it was the first public mental hospital in the state of New Jersey, and the first mental hospital designed on the principle of the Kirkbride Plan. The architect was the Scottish-American John Notman.

Under the hospital's first superintendent, Dr. Horace A. Buttolph, the hospital admitted and treated 86 patients. In 1907, Dr. Henry Cotton became the medical director. Believing that infections were the key to mental illness, he had his staff remove teeth and various other body parts that might become infected from the hospital patients. Cotton's legacy of hundreds of fatalities and thousands of maimed and mutilated patients did not end with his leaving Trenton in 1930 or his death in 1933; in fact, removal of patients' teeth at the Trenton asylum was still the norm until 1960. In the 1940s, Muriel Gardiner remarked on the high rate of organ removal at the hospital.

== See also ==
- John Forbes Nash (1928–2015), patient
- Nathan Trupp (born 1947), patient
- Howard Unruh (1921–2009), patient
- Human experimentation in the United States
- Willowbrook State School
- Greystone Park Psychiatric Hospital, the second "lunatic asylum" opened in New Jersey (1876).
- Madhouse: A Tragic Tale of Megalomania and Modern Medicine
