= John Clare Whitehorn =

American physician

- Born: 1894; Spencer, Nebraska
- Died: 1974 (aged 79–80)
- Education: Doane College; Harvard University
- Occupation: Professor
- Medical career
- Profession: physician and psychiatrist,
- Field: psychiatry
- Institutions: Washington University in St. Louis; Johns Hopkins University
- Research: psychotherapy
- Notable works: psychotherapy with schizophrenia patients

John Clare Whitehorn (1894–1974) was an American psychiatric educator during the mid-20th century.

Whitehorn was born in a sod house in Spencer, Nebraska, on the prairie, the son of a farmer and part-time school teacher. He graduated from Doane College in Crete, Nebraska, and won a scholarship to attend Harvard University Medical School. He graduated in 1921 and began his residency at the McLean Hospital in Waverley, Massachusetts.

In 1938, Whitehorn was hired to lead the Department of Psychiatry at Washington University School of Medicine in St. Louis, Missouri where he remained for three years. He moved to the Johns Hopkins School of Medicine in Baltimore, Maryland as the Henry Phipps Professor of Psychiatry, succeeding Adolf Meyer. Whitehorn became Professor Emeritus in 1961.

In 1955, Whitehorn described his philosophy and methods of psychiatry in his Salmon lectureship of the New York Academy of Medicine, later published under the title Psychiatric Education and Progress. He was active in developing psychiatry curricula for undergraduate education and graduate education programs for psychiatric medical training.

Among his private papers stored at the American Psychiatric Association (APA) was a note describing how he was collected blood from patients for a study on humoral changes and emotion. He talked with the patients and over time it became apparent that the patients with whom he developed a relationship improved clinically. His interest in the process of psychotherapy developed into a research study with Barbara Betz. The research study was published in 1975 under the title Effective Psychotherapy with The Schizophrenia Patient. The study showed that psychiatrists who took an active role in psychotherapy with schizophrenia patients were three times more successful in their patients' clinical improvement than passive psychotherapists.

Whitehorn received numerous honorary degrees: an LHD from Doane College (1947), D.Sc. from the University of Nebraska (1955), and a Sc.D. from the University of Rochester (1971). Other awards presented to Whitehorn included the Hamilton medal of the American Psychopathological Association (1953), the Gutheil Medal of the Association for the Advancement of Psychotherapy (1961), the Bowis medal of the American College of Psychiatry (1967), and the Salmon Medal of the New York Academy of Medicine (1971). He was president of the American Psychiatric Association (1950–1951) and served three terms as president of the American Board of Psychiatry and Neurology (1946, 1948, and 1949).

== Works ==
- Whitehorn, John C. "Guide to Interviewing and Clinical Personality Study," Archives of Neurology and Psychiatry, 52: September 3, 1944, p. 197–216.
- Whitehorn, John C. Psychiatric Education and Progress. Springfield, Ill.: Thomas, 1957.
- Whitehorn, John C., and Daniel Blain. Two Statements on Long Term policies for the American Psychiatric Association. [s.l.: s.n., 1951–].
- Whitehorn, John C. Shattuck Lecture: "The Doctor's Image of Man," The New England Journal of Medicine 265(7) (August 17, 1961): 301–309.
- Whitehorn, John C. "Sigmund the Unserence – A Tragedy in Three Acts," Archives of General Psychiatry 14(1) (January 1, 1966): 108–109.
- Whitehorn, John C., and Barbara J. Betz. Effective Psychotherapy with the Schizophrenic Patient. New York, Aronson, 1975.
- Whitehorn, John C. (ed) Psychiatry and Medical Education. American Psychiatric Association, Washington, DC 1951.
- Whitehorn, John C. (ed) The Psychiatrist, his Training and Development. American Psychiatric Association, Washington, DC, 1953.
