= Patton State Hospital =

Coordinates: 34.1380768°N 117.214540°W

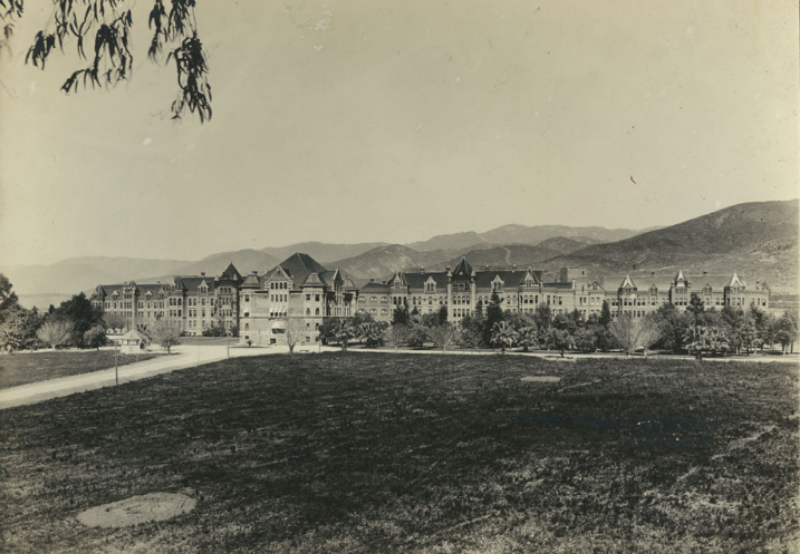
- Original Patton State Hospital building, constructed 1893

Geography
- Location: San Bernardino, California, United States

Organization
- Care system: Public

History
- Founded: 1893

Links
- Lists: Hospitals in California

Patton State Hospital is a forensic psychiatric hospital in San Bernardino, California, United States. Though the hospital has a Patton, California, address, it now lies entirely within the San Bernardino city limits. Operated by the California Department of State Hospitals, Patton State Hospital has a licensed bed capacity of 1,287 for people who have been committed by the judicial system for treatment.

== History ==
Established in 1890 and opened in 1893 as the Southern California State Asylum for the Insane and Inebriates, it was commonly referred to as the Highland asylum or hospital, after its location in Highland Township in San Bernardino County, then unincorporated territory. It was renamed "Patton State Hospital" around 1900, after Henry W. Patton, a journalist who was a member of the facility's first Board of Managers. The hospital was originally built in accordance with the Kirkbride Plan. The original buildings were demolished after they were badly damaged in an earthquake in July 1923.

== Accreditation ==
The hospital is accredited by The Joint Commission (TJC).

== Burials ==
From its opening until 1934, an estimated 2,024 patients who died at the hospital were buried on its grounds. A memorial for them was erected and in 2011 efforts were underway to identify all the deceased.

== Notable patients ==
- Edward Allaway
- David Attias
- Dianne Lake, 16-year-old Manson Family member
- Ron Jeremy
- Bettie Page
- Roderick Scribner
- Nathan Trupp
- Richard Turley
