= Madhouse: A Tragic Tale of Megalomania and Modern Medicine =

2005 book by Andrew Scull

- Author: Andrew Scull
- Language: English
- Subject: Henry Cotton; focal infection theory
- Publisher: Yale University Press
- Publication date: 2005
- Publication place: United States
- Pages: 376
- ISBN: 978-0-300-10729-6

Madhouse: A Tragic Tale of Megalomania and Modern Medicine is a 2005 book by the psychiatric sociologist Andrew Scull which discusses the work of the controversial psychiatrist Henry Cotton at Trenton State Hospital in New Jersey in the 1920s.

Cotton became convinced that insanity was fundamentally a toxic disorder and he surgically removed body parts to try to improve mental health. This often began with the removal of teeth and tonsils:

An 18 year-old girl with agitated depression successively had her upper and lower molars extracted, a tonsillectomy, sinus drainage, treatment for an infected cervix, removal of intestinal adhesions—all without effecting improvement in her psychiatric condition. Then the remainder of her teeth were removed and she was sent home, pronounced cured.

Scull argues that Cotton's obsession with focal sepsis as the root cause of mental illness "persisted in spite of all evidence to the contrary and the frightening incidence of death and harm from the operations he initiated". Cotton's approach attracted some detractors, but the medical establishment of the day did not effectively renounce or discipline him.

One reviewer called Madhouse "a fine piece of historical research with a modern relevance", and added that "it makes compelling reading".

== Reviews ==
The book was reviewed in Psychiatric Services, The Journal of Nervous and Mental Disease, History of Psychiatry, BMJ, The Journal of the American Medical Association, Canadian Medical Association Journal, The New England Journal of Medicine, Bulletin of the History of Medicine, Journal of the History of Medicine and Allied Sciences, Journal of Social History, Journal of American History, London Review of Books, The Times Literary Supplement, The New York Times, and other publications.

== See also ==
- Human experimentation in the United States
- Medical ethics
- Psychosurgery
