= Phyllis Greenacre =

American psychoanalyst

Phyllis Greenacre (3 May 1894 – 24 October 1989) was an American psychoanalyst and physician who was a supervising and training analyst at the New York Psychoanalytic Institute. She was born in Chicago, Illinois and died in Ossining, New York.

== Education and life ==
After taking a BS from Chicago in 1913 and an MD in 1916, Greenacre worked for some years under Adolf Meyer on experimental psychology. During this period, she married and divorced her one husband, after having two children with him in 1921-2. Meyer commissioned her in 1924 to investigate the work of psychiatrist Henry Cotton, who used experimental surgery on his patients to find new ways to cure mental illnesses. Her unflattering and critical report on Cotton's dangerous and pseudoscientific practices was eventually silenced by Meyer.

She began psychoanalytic training in 1937, and thereafter rose to high prominence within the ranks of the American psychoanalytic establishment, before finally retiring at the age of ninety.

== Contributions ==
In an early publication from 1939, Greenacre explored the role of a severe sense of (unconscious) guilt in fueling surgical addiction. Two years later she published her once controversial but now classic study of childhood anxiety as manifested preverbally.

In the fifties, a study of fetishism in relation to body image launched her at fifty-nine into a two-decade long exploration of aggression, creativity and early childhood development. She also wrote on the family background of the imposter.

Her continuing interest in psychoanalytic training led her to a powerful warning against the dangers of boundary transgressions in relation to the transference: “The carrying through into a relationship in life of the incestuous fantasy of the patient may be more grave in its subsequent distortion of the patient's life than any actual incestuous seduction in childhood”.

== Cultural explorations ==
Greenacre highlighted the voyeuristic elements in the writing of Lewis Carroll, as well as distortions of body image with respect to Lemuel Gulliver. She viewed Swift as essentially a neurotic inhibited by coprophilia who came close to achieving adult, genital satisfaction. Carroll, on the other hand, she argues, is closer to psychotic and psychically more deeply blocked.

== See also ==
- Ego psychology
- Fritz Wittels
- Heinz Hartmann
- Helene Deutsch
- Psychoanalytic literary criticism
