= Emil Gutheil =

Emil Arthur Gutheil (January 21, 1889 – July 7, 1959) was a Polish-American psychiatrist specializing in human sexuality, music therapy, and psychoanalysis. He was a founder of the Association for the Advancement of Psychotherapy and editor of the American Journal of Psychotherapy.

== Life and career ==
Gutheil was born in Poland and educated at the University of Vienna. He was neuro-psychiatrist at the University Clinic and served as personal assistant to Wilhelm Stekel. He co-founded the Active-analytic Clinic in Vienna, but emigrated with his wife to the United States in the late 1930s, fearing Nazi persecution. He served at the psychiatric clinic of Mount Sinai Hospital, New York. Gutheil edited Stekel's autobiography.

Gutheil died in New York City following a heart attack. The Gutheil Library at Baruch College and the Gutheil Memorial Conference of the Association for the Advancement of Psychotherapy are named in his honor.

== Selected publications ==
- Gutheil EA (1930). An analysis of a case of transvestism. In Stekel, Sexual Aberrations; the Phenomenon of Fetishism in Relation to Sex. Liveright, pp. 345–351.
- Gutheil, EA (1934). "Analysis of a Case of Migraine". Psychoanalytic Review. 21: 272–299.
- Gutheil EA (1939). The Language of the Dream. M.D. New York - The Macmillan Company.
- Gutheil, EA (1944). "Psychoanalysis and brief psychotherapy". J. Clin. Psychopath. & Psychotherapy. VI: 207–230.
- Gutheil, EA (Oct 1947). "Occupational neurosis in a musician". Am J Psychother. 1 (4): 448–67. PMID 20270197.
- Gutheil, EA (Jan 1947). "A rare case of sadomasochism". Am J Psychother. 1 (1): 87–92. PMID 20290166.
- Gutheil, EA (Spring 1999). "Dream and suicide". Am J Psychother. 53 (2): 246–57. PMID 10415994.
- Gutheil, EA (Oct 1948). "Training in psychotherapy". Am J Psychother. 2 (4): 676–89. PMID 18103766.
- Gutheil, EA (Jul 1949). "On the margin". Am J Psychother. 3 (3): 430–3. PMID 18136697.
- Gutheil EA (1951). The handbook of dream analysis. Liveright. 1970 reprint ISBN 978-0-87140-219-6
- Stekel W, Gutheil EA, eds. (1952). Patterns of psychosexual infantilism. Liveright, ISBN 978-0-87140-840-2
- Gutheil EA (1952). Music and your emotions. Liveright. 1970 reprint ISBN 978-0-87140-232-5
- Gutheil, EA (October 1952). "Does psychotherapy dormant psychoses?". Am J Psychother. 6: 673–6. PMID 13007854.
- Gutheil, EA (Jan 1954). "Music as adjunct to psychotherapy". Am J Psychother. 8 (1): 94–109. PMID 13124590.
- Gutheil, EA (Apr 1954). "The psychologic background of transsexualism and transvestism". Am J Psychother. 8 (2): 231–9. PMID 13148377.
- Gutheil, EA (Nov 1955). "Current trends in psychotherapy". J Med Soc N J. 52 (11): 580–5. PMID 13271957.
- Gutheil, EA (Oct 1955). "Pseudoneurotic forms of depressive psychosis". Am J Psychother. 9 (4): 719–36. PMID 1325888.
- Gutheil, EA (Oct 1958). "Public education in preventive psychiatry". Am J Psychother. 12 (4): 826–30. PMID 13583272.
- Gutheil, EA (Apr 1958). "Dreams as an aid in evaluating ego strength". Am J Psychother. 12 (2): 338–57. PMID 13521056.
- Gutheil EA (1959). Reactive depressions. Reactive depressions. In S. Arieti (Ed.), American handbook of psychiatry, Vol. 1. New York: Basic Books, 1959.
- Gutheil, EA (October 1959). "Problems of therapy in obsessive-compulsive neurosis". Am J Psychother. 13: 793–808. PMID 13830448.
- Stekel W, Gutheil EA, Wertham F, van Teslaar JS (1961). Auto-erotism: a psychiatric study of masturbation and neurosis. Grove Press
- Gutheil, EA (Apr 1962). "The exhibitionism of Jean Jacques Rousseau. An abstract of Stekel's analysis". Am J Psychother. 16: 266–77. PMID 13903148.
