= 1976 California State University, Fullerton massacre =

1976 mass shooting in Fullerton, California, US

Coordinates: 33°52′53″N 117°53′6″W

- Location: Fullerton, California, U.S.
- Date: July 12, 1976; 50 years ago
- Target: California State University, Fullerton
- Attack type: Mass shooting; school shooting; workplace shooting; mass murder
- Weapon: .22 caliber semi-automatic rifle
- Deaths: 7
- Injuries: 2
- Perpetrator: Edward Charles Allaway

The 1976 California State University, Fullerton massacre was a mass shooting committed by a custodian, Edward Charles Allaway (born 1939), on July 12, 1976, at California State University, Fullerton, in Fullerton, California, United States. Seven people were killed as a result. It was the deadliest act of mass murder in Orange County until the 2011 Seal Beach shooting, in which eight people died.

Allaway had a history of violence and mental illness. He was diagnosed with paranoid schizophrenia and deemed insane by a judge after being convicted by a jury. He was initially imprisoned at Patton State Hospital under medical treatment. In 2016, the then-77-year-old was transferred to Napa State Hospital.

== Events ==
The gunman, 37-year-old Edward Charles Allaway, was a custodian at the university's library. Armed with a .22 caliber semi-automatic rifle he purchased at a Kmart in Buena Park, Allaway killed seven people and injured two others in the library's first-floor lobby and at the building's Instructional Media Center (IMC), located in the basement. Witnesses told investigators that Allaway's attack began shortly before 7 am, with some witnesses claiming the gunfire was like a machine gun in a movie, while others likened it to a "popping" noise. He reportedly chased down Deborah Paulsen and Donald Karges before killing them, and shot Bruce Jacobson after Jacobson attempted to subdue him with a metal statue. After shooting Seth Fessenden and Paul Herzberg, he took a service elevator down to the first floor and shot Frank Teplansky and left a visiting high school student unharmed. He then shot Stephen Becker before he ran out of bullets.

An eyewitness who was a part of a high school program stated Allaway was agitated when he saw him. The eyewitness stated that he saw Allaway pass by him and another counselor who had gone into the hallway to investigate the noises. Allaway reportedly stated, "He doesn't belong here; he doesn't belong here." before aiming his rifle at the eyewitness and the other counselor. However, instead of firing at the two individuals Allaway lowered the gun and ran in the opposite direction, and soon after the two could hear more gunfire.

Allaway fled the school campus, went to Hilton Inn Hotel a nearby hotel in Anaheim, where his former wife worked, and telephoned police to report his actions. He told them, "I went berserk at Cal State Fullerton, and I committed some terrible act. I'd appreciate it if you people would come down and pick me up. I'm unarmed, and I'm giving myself up to you."

== Victims ==
The deceased victims were Paul Herzberg, 30, Bruce Jacobson, 32, Donald Karges, 41, Deborah Paulsen, 25, Seth Fessenden, 72, Frank Teplansky, 51 and Stephen Becker, 32. The injured victims were Maynard Hoffman, 64 and Donald Keran, 55.

== Perpetrator ==
Allaway was found guilty of six counts of first degree murder and one count of second degree murder. A second phase of the trial determined that he was not sane. Five different mental health professionals diagnosed him with paranoid schizophrenia. He presented a history of mental illness, as he had tried to commit suicide and had been hospitalized and treated with electroconvulsive therapy in the past. He was committed to the California state mental hospital system, beginning at Atascadero State Hospital. He was then transferred and held at Patton State Hospital in San Bernardino. In 2016, the 77-year-old was transferred to the less secure Napa State Hospital. The families of Allaway's victims protested his transfer.

He was found to have injured a co-worker at a Michigan plant. A short time before the shooting rampage, he had threatened his wife with a knife and raped her. Allaway's apparent motive was that he had delusions that pornographers were forcing his wife to appear in movies. The couple had separated over Memorial Day Weekend 1976 after a blow-up. His wife had filed for divorce shortly before Allaway attacked co-workers at the university.

The defense alleged that library staff members screened commercial pornographic movies before library opening hours and in break rooms, but Allaway's wife was not in them.

== Trial and release hearings ==
After a 1977 jury convicted Allaway of murder but deadlocked in the sanity phase of the trial, a judge found Allaway not guilty by reason of insanity. By law, defendants found insane are committed to a mental institution until they are found sane. Allaway remained institutionalized at Patton State Hospital for a number of years. During his time at Patton, Allaway made several failed petitions to the courts asking for his release. He was eventually transferred to Napa State Hospital in 2016 where he currently resides.

In the summer of 2009, officials at Patton indicated that Allaway was asymptomatic, had not needed medication, and they would recommend his release. The district attorney contacted the governor and the state mental health director to protest the hospital's planned action, given his history of violence and the mass murder. Patton withdrew the recommendation for release a few months later.

Victim Stephen Becker's father was the university's founding dean of students. He provided comments against Allaway's release on several occasions.

== Aftermath ==
In July 2016, survivors and family of the deceased victims commemorated the fortieth anniversary of the attack with a candlelight vigil.

== See also ==
- List of school shootings in the United States by death toll
- List of homicides in California
