= Klekotiv =

Rural locality in Lviv Oblast, Ukraine

Klekotiv Клекотів Klekotów
- Village
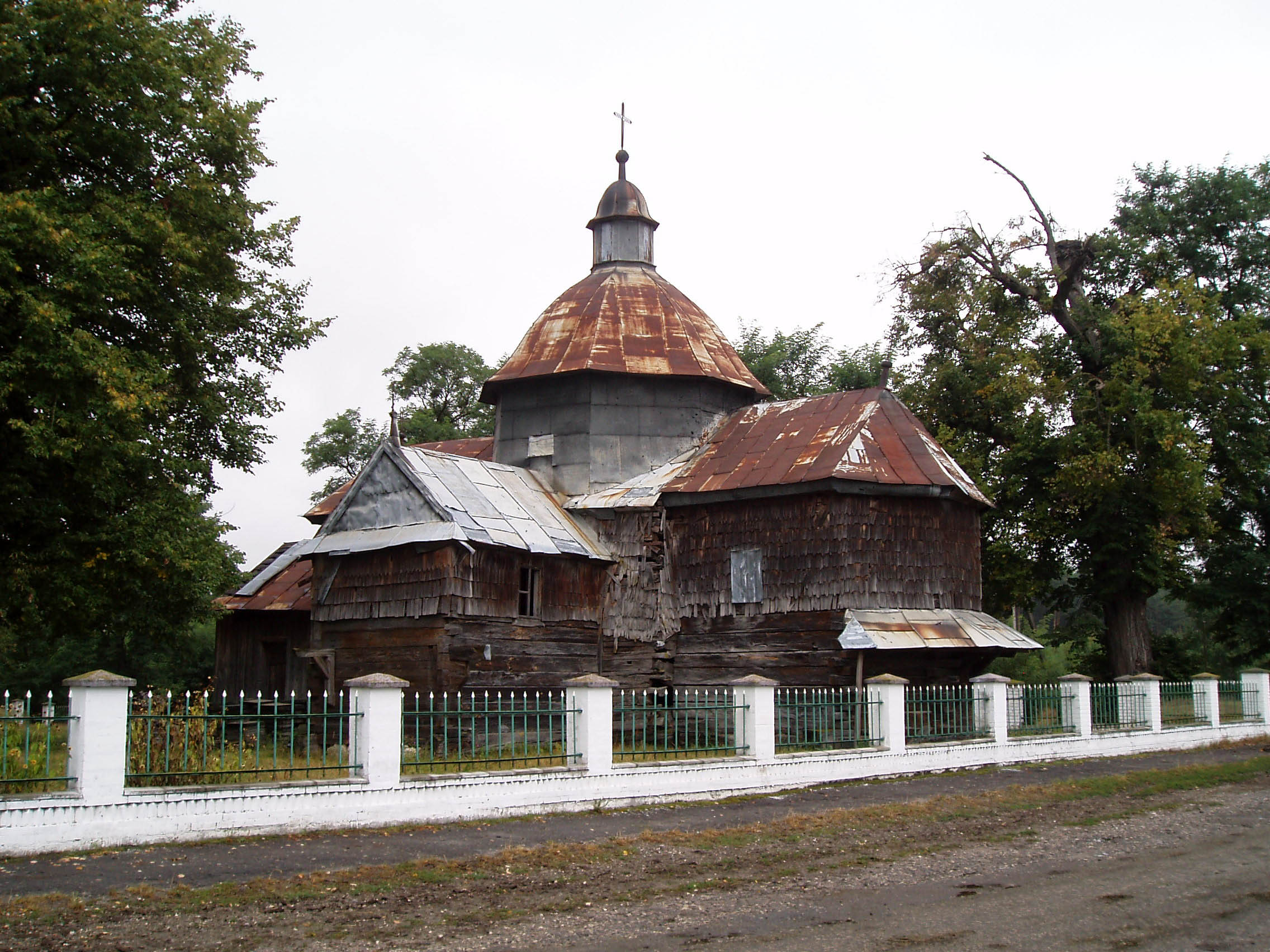
- Church of St. John the Evangelist

- Location within Lviv Oblast Location within Ukraine
- Coordinates: 50°9′18″N 25°11′45″E
- Country: Ukraine
- Oblast: Lviv Oblast
- Raion: Zolochiv Raion
- Area: 0.947 km^{2} (0.366 sq mi)
- Population: 314
  - Density: 331/km^{2} (860/sq mi)

Klekotiv (Ukrainian: Клекотів; Polish: Klekotów) is a village (selo) in Zolochiv Raion, Lviv Oblast, in western Ukraine. It belongs to Brody urban hromada, one of the hromadas of Ukraine. Klekotiv has a population of 314.

From 1918 to 1939, the village, formerly known as Klekotów, was in Tarnopol Voivodeship in Poland.

Until 18 July 2020, Klekotiv belonged to Brody Raion. The raion was abolished in July 2020 as part of the administrative reform of Ukraine, which reduced the number of raions of Lviv Oblast to seven. The area of Brody Raion was merged into Zolochiv Raion.

== Notable residents ==
- Leo Kanner, a Jewish-American psychiatrist who wrote works in the 1940s relating to autism
