= Desperate Remedies: Psychiatry's Turbulent Quest to Cure Mental Illness =

2022 book by Andrew Scull

- First edition (US)
- Author: Andrew Scull
- Language: English
- Subject: History of psychiatry
- Published: 2022
- Publisher: The Belknap Press (US); Allen Lane (UK)
- Publication place: United States
- Media type: Print
- Pages: 494
- ISBN: 9780674265103
- OCLC: https://lccn.loc.gov/2021047502
- Dewey Decimal: 362.20973
- Preceded by: Madness in Civilization: A Cultural History of Insanity (Princeton University Press, 2015)

Desperate Remedies: Psychiatry's Turbulent Quest to Cure Mental Illness by sociologist Andrew Scull is a critical history of two hundred years of treatment of mental disorders in the United States. From the "birth of the asylum" in the 1830s to the drug trials and genetic studies of the 2000s, Scull catalogues efforts by psychoanalysts, psychologists, neuroscientists and social reformers to diagnose and treat mental maladies.

== Overview ==
Scull maps out the progression of the treatment of mental disorders, beginning in the 19th century with state asylums or state hospitals whose inhabitants, “poor and the friendless”, reached a population of half a million by 1950. The wealthy, on the other hand, got treated at home with often dangerous substances such as morphine and strychnine. Scull details the personalities and progress behind other treatments like Hydrotherapy, electrotherapy, insulin shock therapy, injections of camphor, Metrazol, electroconvulsive or “shock” therapy, as well as frequently deadly surgical interventions such as colectomy, and lobotomy. He also explores the progression of disease models from humorism to the biochemical model of mental illness, and the advent of psychopharmacology and the development and travails of the Diagnostic and Statistical Manual of Mental Disorders.

== Reception ==
The book's critical reception was positive. Richard McNally called the book "an indisputable masterpiece" in the Wall Street Journal. Rebecca Lawrence of the Guardian said it was, "meticulously researched and beautifully written, and even funny at times, despite the harrowing content."

== See also ==
- Anti-psychiatry
- Michel Foucault
- History of mental disorders
- History of psychiatry
- R. D. Laing
- Thomas Szasz
