= Howard Unruh =

American mass murderer (1921–2009)

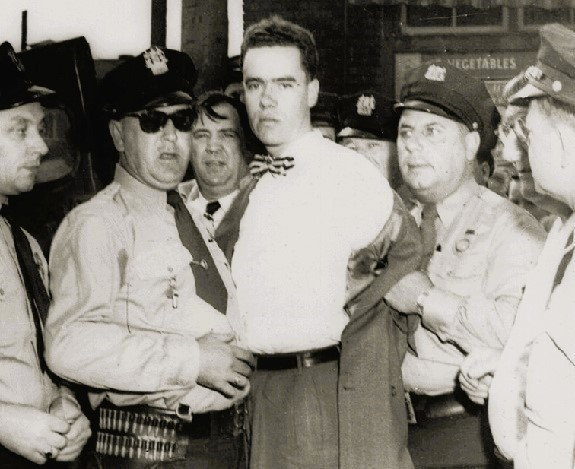
- Unruh (center), pictured immediately upon his arrest
- Born: Howard Barton Unruh; January 21, 1921; East Camden, New Jersey, U.S.
- Died: October 19, 2009 (aged 88); Trenton, New Jersey, U.S.
- Motive: Inconclusive (most likely paranoid delusions possibly sourcing from post-traumatic stress disorder)
- Conviction: Unattributable due to being declared legally insane
- Criminal charges: First-degree murder (x13); Assault and battery with intent to kill (x3)
- Penalty: Involuntary commitment

Details
- Date: September 6, 1949; 77 years ago 9:20 a.m. - 9:32 a.m.
- Locations: Camden, New Jersey, U.S.
- Targets: Neighbors, random strangers
- Killed: 13
- Injured: 3
- Weapon: Luger P08
- Military career
- Allegiance: United States
- Branch: United States Army
- Service years: 1942–1945
- Rank: Private first class
- Unit: Battery C, 342nd Armored Field Artillery Battalion
- Conflicts: World War II: Battle of the Bulge; Operation Northwind; Central Europe Campaign; Operation Grapeshot
- Awards: European Theater of Operations Medal; World War II Victory Medal; Good Conduct Medal

Howard Barton Unruh (January 21, 1921 – October 19, 2009) was an American mass murderer who shot and killed thirteen people and injured three others during a twelve-minute walk through a one-block span of his neighborhood in Camden, New Jersey, on September 6, 1949. The incident, which became known as the "Walk of Death" and the "Camden shootings", ended after Unruh surrendered to police after running out of ammunition.

Diagnosed as being legally insane and thus immune to criminal prosecution, Unruh was committed at the New Jersey State Hospital. He died at this facility in 2009 at the age of 88 following over 60 years of confinement.

The "Camden shootings" remained the deadliest mass shooting to occur in the United States (in terms of number of fatalities) until the 1966 University of Texas tower shooting, and are widely regarded as the first example of a mass shooting by a lone gunman to occur in America following World War II.

== Early life and adolescence ==
Howard Barton Unruh was born in East Camden, New Jersey on January 21, 1921, the first of two children born to Samuel Shipley and Freda Eichel (née Vollmer) Unruh. He had one younger brother, James Frederick (b. November 22, 1923).

The Unruh household was middle class, and both parents held strong work ethics. Unruh's parents were devout Lutherans; both insisted their children visit church every Sunday and both study and abide by Biblical scriptures. The couple separated when Unruh was a child; the separation was on amicable terms, with Unruh's mother retaining custody of both children and both sons remaining on friendly terms with their father.

Unruh was a quiet, taciturn child, and viewed by his peers as something of a loner. He attended Cramer Junior High School before progressing to Woodrow Wilson High School in 1935. Here, he was again viewed as a loner who seldom interacted with, particularly, his female classmates, although he did participate in non-athletic extracurricular activities. Unruh typically achieved B grades, and his classmates respected his intelligence — nicknaming him "How". His overall scholastic record was above average, and he graduated from high school in January 1939.

=== Further education and conscription ===
Between 1939 and 1942, Unruh resided with his mother and younger brother at 3202 River Road, Cramer Hill, East Camden. The apartment itself was upon a cul-de-sac, with a kitchen door opening to a yard at the rear of the property being the only direct entrance. Aside from a middle-aged couple named Elias and Caroline Pinner — with whom Unruh became acquainted via his mother — he seldom socialized with any individual outside his immediate family, and spent much of his free time in his bedroom, basement, or reading the Bible. Following his graduation from Woodrow Wilson High School, Unruh worked in at least two local menial professions as he reportedly pondered which career path he should pursue.

By 1941, Unruh had decided to pursue a career as a pharmacist; (Note: Unruh's 1939 high school yearbook entry indicates that his primary ambition at age 18 was to become a government employee.) he was preparing to study for this career when America entered World War II following the December 1941 Japanese attack on Pearl Harbor. He was drafted into the United States Army the following year. (Note: Some sources state Unruh volunteered to enlist in the military.)

== Military service ==
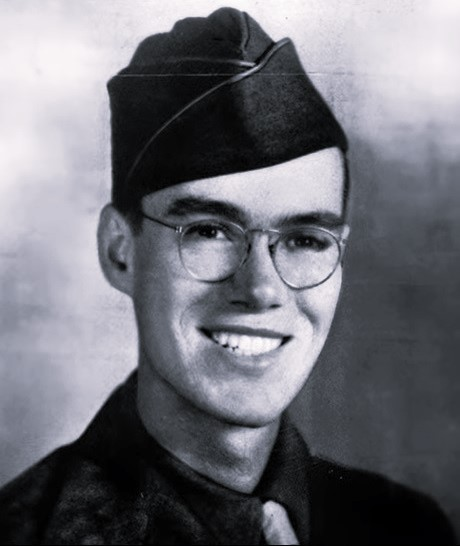
Unruh, pictured shortly after his 1942 conscription into the United States Army

Unruh's military service began on October 27, 1942. His military record was exemplary, and he saw active service across Europe as a sharpshooter and, later, tank gunner between October 1944 and July 1945 in campaigns including the Battle of the Bulge and the Western Allied invasion of Germany. Although fellow soldiers spent many of their off-duty hours drinking, smoking, gambling or chasing women, Unruh — a teetotaler who refrained from using profane language — preferred to spend his free time reading his Bible, writing letters to his mother and/or Mrs. Caroline Pinner, or either cleaning his rifle or taking the weapon apart, then reassembling it. Nonetheless, his comrades respected his marksmanship skills and bravery under fire, with one fellow soldier later remarking that, although Unruh was not "the most sociable" of men he had served alongside, he was "worth having on your side in a fight".

Throughout his military service, Unruh kept a diary in which he meticulously listed the enemy soldiers he had killed by location, date, and hour — also adding the appearance and positioning of the body if possible.

=== Honorable discharge ===
On November 30, 1945, Unruh was honorably discharged from the military, having been awarded several military distinctions for exemplary conduct and bravery under fire, including the European Theater of Operations Medal, the World War II Victory Medal, and the Good Conduct Medal. He returned to New Jersey to live with his mother and brother and found employment within a printing firm. Unruh held this position for seven months before finding alternate employment as a sheet-metal worker. He later resigned from this position to resume his earlier plans to become a pharmacist.

== Postwar life ==
Both Unruh's father and brother later remarked that his wartime experiences had markedly changed his persona: although still devoutly religious and an ardent reader of the Bible, he was markedly sullen, nervous, suspicious, and detached. Several individuals who lived or worked close to the Unruh family home gradually began to view Howard as something of a "religious nut"; however, neither he nor they made any effort to socialize or otherwise become acquainted beyond occasional perfunctory conversations.

Throughout his military service, Unruh had developed a fixation with firearms, weaponry and military strategies. He gradually converted his bedroom into something of a shrine to war and weaponry; he also converted the family basement into a private shooting range, which he adorned with his general service medals and where he practiced his marksmanship skills on an almost daily basis. In the years following Unruh's return from active duty, he legally purchased a number of weapons including a semi-automatic Luger P08 pistol.

By mid-1947, Unruh was seldom employed, and largely supported his hobby via the income his mother made in her employment as a packer at a local soap factory.

To achieve his career goal of becoming a pharmacist, Unruh completed a high school science refresher course in 1947 before enrolling at the Temple University School of Pharmacy in Philadelphia in the fall of 1948. Unruh neglected to present his credentials from the Veterans Administration upon enrollment, which would have seen him entitled to free tuition, stationery and a monthly allowance of $75 (equivalent to $1,005 in 2025). His attendance record became increasingly sporadic, and he abandoned his studies after three months.

In approximately 1947, Unruh enrolled in a Bible study class, where he became reacquainted with, and later began dating, a pious young woman whom he had known prior to his overseas military deployment. This woman would prove to be Unruh's only known girlfriend. The two dated for several months before Unruh terminated the relationship — in part so that he could devote more of his free time and money to his weaponry collection and marksmanship practice. He would later confess that, shortly after terminating this relationship, he began frequenting a Philadelphia cinema known locally as a homosexual pick-up venue on a weekly basis to engage in furtive sexual encounters with men.

Unruh ceased attending church in the spring of 1948, although he continued to read the Bible. The same year, his younger brother married a young woman named Evelyn Armbrecht and relocated to the borough of Haddon Heights.

=== Social isolation ===
By the late 1940s, Unruh's relations with his neighbors — and members of the public in general — had begun to deteriorate, largely due to Unruh's resentful conviction he was the target of ongoing and increasing public slandering and a victim of general injustice. As such, he began compiling a list of perceived injustices in which he recorded the names of neighbors and members of the public, the real or imagined grievance, and either the notation "retal" — for "retaliation" — or the initials "D. N. D. R.", for "Do Not Delay Retaliation". By the summer of 1949, this list included close to 200 incidents of real or perceived slights — over 180 accompanied by a reference to retaliation.

One family referenced on this list scores of times was the Cohen family — Unruh's neighbors. Many of these diary entries regarding the Cohen family referenced 41-year-old pharmacist Maurice Cohen, with whom Unruh had an ongoing feud sourcing from Unruh's habit of trespassing through the Cohens' back yard via a gate as a more direct means to access his apartment. Other entries referenced Rose Cohen asking Unruh to turn the volume of his wireless down, and 12-year-old Charles Cohen frequently playing his bugle too loud. Other individuals Unruh had listed included the local shoemaker, John Pilarchik, whom Unruh blamed for causing water seepage into his basement following the construction of Pilarchik's business premises in the summer of 1949, and a boy whom he knew only as "a kid named Sorg" who had sold Christmas trees outside his apartment the previous December and who had tapped into the Unruhs' electricity supply.

== September 1949 ==
In early September 1949, Unruh installed a high wooden fence and a large security gate at the bottom of his back yard, affording him direct access to 32nd Street. Both his father and Elias Pinner assisted in the construction of this gate and fence, believing the fence may calm Unruh's increasingly agitated and somewhat paranoid temperament. On the evening of September 5, Unruh visited the 24-hour movie theater in Philadelphia he had frequented for approximately two years; he twice watched the movies I Cheated the Law and The Lady Gambles before returning home at approximately 3 a.m.

Upon returning home, Unruh discovered that the security gate he had recently installed for the specific purposes of keeping his neighbors off the family property and obscuring his vision of the outside world had been stolen. He later informed investigators that, externally, he had remained calm; he entered his property, removed his shoes and laid on his bed fully clothed as he stared at the ceiling plotting revenge. He woke up at approximately 8:20 a.m.

=== Camden shootings ===
On the morning of September 6, 1949, Unruh dressed in a brown worsted suit before entering the family kitchen for a breakfast of cereal, fried eggs and milk his mother had prepared. He sat at the breakfast table but simply stared at his mother with a menacing expression on his face for several moments before abruptly standing, then running back into his bedroom. Unruh then threatened his mother — who, alarmed at his state of agitation, had followed him into his bedroom — with a large wrench, causing her to flee to a neighbor's home, where she fainted. He then loaded the magazine of his Luger P08 pistol with ammunition before pocketing a second, loaded eight-round magazine, numerous spare rounds of ammunition, a hunting knife, and a tear gas pen with six shells. (Note: Unruh later informed investigators he had also equipped himself with a hunting knife as he had initially intended to behead the Cohen family.) He then left the family home at approximately 9:17 a.m., exiting via the gap in the fence where his gate had been stolen.

The first individual Unruh encountered was a 33-year-old delivery driver named Roxy DiMarco, whose vehicle was parked one block from his home. DiMarco threw himself backwards from his seat as Unruh fired once through the window of his truck in the direction of his chest. The shot missed DiMarco by inches. According to DiMarco, Unruh simply shrugged and walked away. DiMarco then ushered two children into his truck before driving from the scene and attempting to warn residents of the danger.

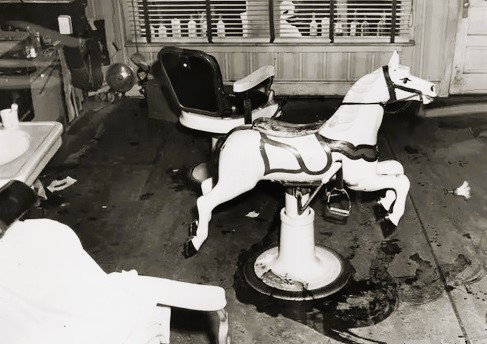
Interior of 3210 River Road, pictured following the murders of Clark Hoover and Orris Smith

Unruh then walked into a nearby shoe repair shop, where he observed the owner, 27-year-old John Joseph Pilarchik, nailing the heel onto a child's shoe. Unruh shot and killed Pilarchik — whom he had known for over a decade — from a distance of less than three feet. He then entered the adjacent barber's shop at 3210 River Road, where he observed the owner, 45-year-old Clark Hoover, cutting the hair of six-year-old Orris Martin Smith, who was sat on a novelty wooden carousel horse as Smith's mother, Edwina, and 11-year-old sister, Norma, watched. According to another patron in the premises, Unruh approached Hoover and calmly stated "I've got something for you, Clarkie" as Hoover — observing the firearm — attempted to shield Smith with his body. Unruh then fatally shot Smith once in the head before shooting Hoover in the head and body. He then exited the barbershop as Smith's mother and sister screamed.

After finding the front door of a tavern locked and unsuccessfully attempting to shoot his way into the premises, Unruh approached the pharmacy operated by his neighbor and primary target, Maurice Cohen. En route, the owner of the tavern, Frank Engel, fired one shot at Unruh from a second-story window with a .38 caliber revolver. He succeeded in wounding Unruh in the upper left leg, causing him to briefly stumble to the sidewalk, although Unruh paid little or no attention to the wound and did not return fire at Engel. (Note: Police only discovered this injury after a lengthy post-arrest interview with Unruh.)

As Unruh approached the door to the Cohen drugstore, he encountered the Unruh family insurance agent, 46-year-old James Winfield Hutton, exiting the premises. Although Unruh had no grudge against Hutton and the insurance agent greeted him before observing that he was armed, Unruh fatally shot him in the head and chest; he later informed investigators his reason for doing so was because Hutton "didn't get out of [his] way" fast enough.

From within the drugstore, Maurice Cohen observed Unruh fatally shoot Hutton. He ran upstairs into the stock room to warn his family as Unruh chased him. In the stock room, Unruh observed Cohen's 38-year-old wife, Rose, attempting to hide in a storage cupboard; he shot twice through the cupboard door, causing her to fall out of the closet to the floor. Unruh then fatally shot her through the head. He then entered an adjoining office, where he observed Maurice Cohen's 63-year-old mother, Minnie, attempting to phone the police. She was then fatally shot in the head and chest.

Maurice Cohen had climbed onto the pitched porch roof of the family drugstore in an effort to escape. Unruh overheard his efforts. In response, he leaned out of a window and shot Cohen once in the back, causing him to fall to the sidewalk; he then took careful aim and killed the pharmacist with a shot to the back of the head. The Cohens' 12-year-old son, Charles — who had also hidden in a closet — was unharmed.

Unruh then exited the pharmacy. He encountered a 24-year-old man named Alvin Milton Day, who had stopped his car to attempt to assist James Hutton. Unruh fatally shot Day once in the head at point-blank range. Another individual who had stopped his car to assist James Hutton, 18-year-old Charles Petersen, was shot in both legs, but survived his injuries. After firing through the locked front door of a grocery store, Unruh approached a blue Chevrolet coupé waiting at an intersection stop light. He fired through the open drivers-side window, killing the driver, Helen Wilson, and her elderly mother, 69-year-old Emma Matlack. Wilson's 10-year-old son, John, was fatally wounded in the neck; he died of his injuries at Cooper University Hospital the following day.

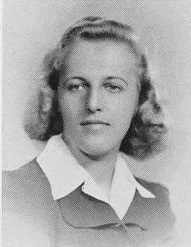
Helga Zegrino

Unruh then entered the business premises of another individual whom he believed had slighted him: tailor Thomas Zegrino. Although Thomas Zegrino was not present in the building, Unruh encountered his wife of two months, 29-year-old Helga Matilde Zegrino, in the kitchen at the rear of the premises. The young woman burst into tears, sank to her knees and pleaded for her life, saying: "Oh my God, please don't!" before she was shot twice. Thomas Zegrino was one of few of Unruh's intended targets whom he failed to kill.

After exiting the tailor's, Unruh observed a toddler staring at him through the ground floor window of 3208 River Road. He fired once, instantly killing two-year-old Thomas Hamilton with a shot between the eyes. The child's caregiver, Marguerite Rice, collapsed upon witnessing the shooting; the resultant shock and hysteria would see her briefly hospitalized. (Note: Unruh would later claim that he did not know the age of the individual he had seen staring at him from the window of 3208 River Road or whether his shot had hit his target.)

Unruh then observed 36-year-old Madaline Harrie and her 16-year-old son, Armond, seeking refuge in the kitchen of their home. He kicked open the back door of the premises and wounded Madaline once in the left shoulder before shooting Armond in both arms, then striking the teenager over the head with the grip of his pistol. As the bullets Unruh fired into the Harries were the final three in his possession, he was unable to fatally shoot either family member. He then returned to his residence to obtain further ammunition.

Moments after Unruh entered his apartment, numerous armed police officers began to converge upon and around River Road, forcing Unruh to barricade himself within his mother's residence as he reloaded his Luger. The first officer on the scene was Detective William E. Kelly Sr. A standoff ensued, during which journalist Philip Buxton of the Camden Courier-Post — having heard Unruh's identity reported over police radio — retrieved Unruh's number from a local telephone directory and dialed it. In what Buxton later described as "a strong, clear voice", Unruh answered the telephone. He and Buxton had the following brief conversation:

Casualties

Killed:

- John Joseph Pilarchik (27)
- Orris Martin Smith (6)
- Clark Ronald Hoover (45)
- James Winfield Hutton (46)
- Rose Fine Cohen (38)
- Minnie Cohen (63)
- Dr. Maurice J. Cohen (41)
- Alvin Milton Day Jr. (24)
- Helen Garland Wilson (37)
- Emma J. Matlack (69)
- John M. Wilson (10)
- Helga Matilde Zegrino (29)
- Thomas Hamilton (2)

Injured:

- Charles Petersen (18)
- Madaline E. Harrie (36)
- Armond Duane Harrie (16)

"Hello,"
"Is this Howard?"
"Yes ... what's the last name of the party you want?"
"Unruh."
"Who are you and what do you want?"
"Unruh. I'm a friend, and I want to know what they're doing to you."
"Well, they haven't done anything to me, yet, but I'm doing plenty to them."
(In a soothing, reassuring voice) "How many have you killed?"
"I don't know yet — I haven't counted them ... but it looks like a pretty good score."
"Why are you killing people?"
"I don't know. I can't answer that yet, I'm too busy ... I'll have to talk to you later."

=== End of incident ===
Although police fired several rounds into Unruh's apartment, he was not wounded in this exchange of gunfire. He surrendered shortly after 10 a.m. after police threw two tear gas canisters through the shattered windows into the apartment, the second of which detonated, filling the room in which Unruh had barricaded himself with gas. Two armed officers, Patrolman Charles Hance and Captain Everett Joslin, then ascended to the first floor of the building and shouted, "Come down with your hands up!" to which Unruh replied, "I give up. Don't shoot." Unruh emerged from the room and stumbled down the stairs at the rear of the building, falling at the feet of the officers as numerous spectators shouted threats and abuse. He offered no resistance and maintained a calm demeanor as he was handcuffed by Sergeant Earl Wright.

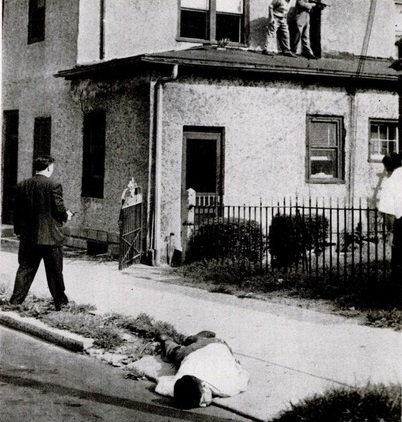
Police converge upon Unruh's apartment, c. 9:45 a.m.

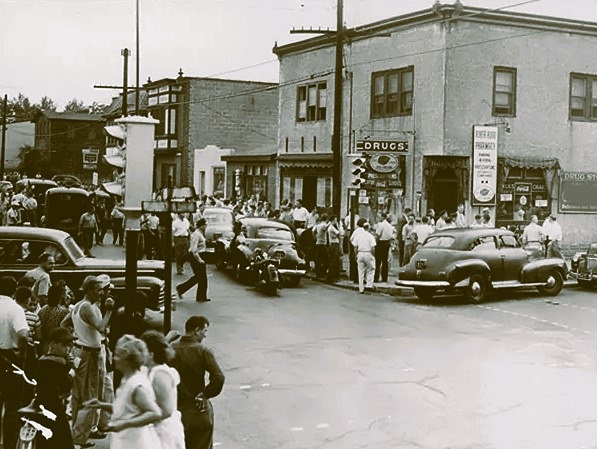
Police and members of the public, pictured outside Unruh's apartment shortly after his arrest

Moments after Unruh was handcuffed, Detective Vincent Connelly questioned his motives as he frisked Unruh, asking: "What's the matter with you? Are you a psycho?" to which Unruh replied: "I'm no psycho. I have a good mind." He would also explain that the reason he had chosen not to engage in a gunfight with arresting officers was because he "didn't have anything against the police".

Investigators later determined that Unruh had fired a total of thirty-three rounds prior to surrendering to authorities — each of which had been fired from his Luger P08 pistol. A search of his apartment revealed his extensive collection of firearms and other military paraphernalia, including over seven hundred rounds of ammunition of varying calibers. Also discovered was a Bible opened to chapter twenty-four of the Gospel of Matthew, and several books relating to sexual hygiene.

== Arrest and indictments ==
Under police interrogation, Unruh provided a meticulous account of his crimes and his justification for his actions, which was later released to the public by Camden County prosecutor Mitchell Cohen (no relation to Maurice Cohen). He expressed no regret or remorse for his actions, which he justified on account of his belief his victims "had been making derogatory remarks about my character" and stated he would "do the same thing again" if given the opportunity, adding "only this time I would get the Sorg boy, the restaurant man, the tailor and the man and wife in the apartment house."

At the conclusion of this initial two-hour interrogation, police discovered that Unruh had received a single bullet wound in his upper left thigh. He was subsequently taken — under armed guard — to Cooper Hospital to receive treatment. (Note: One of the individuals Unruh had wounded, John Wilson, would succumb to his injuries within Cooper Hospital on the morning of September 7.)

On September 22, a grand jury formally indicted Unruh on thirteen counts of first-degree murder and three counts of assault and battery with intent to kill. At the time of these indictments, Unruh had been released from hospital and was undergoing formal psychological evaluations, although county prosecutor Mitchell Cohen announced on this date his intention to prepare motions for trial if Unruh was ruled sane.

=== Psychological assessments ===
Upon his release from Cooper Hospital, Unruh was extensively assessed by a panel of eminent psychiatrists. These assessments were conducted over the course of several weeks. On October 7, the panel unanimously declared Unruh legally insane, classifying him as "a case of dementia praecox, mixed type, with pronounced catatonic and paranoid coloring". This panel also determined that Unruh had nurtured a persecution complex for at least two years prior to his murder spree. As such, under New Jersey law, he was unable to be brought to trial upon any of the outstanding criminal indictments pertaining to his murder spree.

For sheer horror, the massacre which occurred in Camden last September 6 was without parallel in the criminal annals of this country. Thirteen innocent people lost their lives during a homicidal rampage of one man. The very wantonness of the killings and their number caused concern in the minds of a great number of people to his sanity ... The state was prepared to try this case at once if Unruh could be placed on trial. Under the laws of this state, however, an insane person cannot be tried. There is no alternative but to have Unruh committed to the state mental hospital. I here and now serve notice on Unruh and his family that, so long as I live, I shall vigorously oppose any attempt by anyone at any time to have this man released into society.

— Camden County prosecutor Mitchell Cohen, announcing Unruh's imminent committal to an institution for the criminally insane, October 7, 1949.

On October 8, the Camden County prosecutor instigated legal proceedings for Unruh's committal to an institution for the criminally insane.

== Committal ==
Unruh was transferred to the New Jersey State Hospital (now Trenton Psychiatric Hospital), to be held indefinitely in a private cell in the maximum-security Vroom Building. The sole individual Unruh agreed to correspond with or receive visits from was his mother, who maintained frequent contact with her son until her death in June 1985.

In 1979, Unruh requested to be transferred from Trenton Psychiatric Hospital to a minimum security state psychiatric hospital in Evesham Township, to be closer to his mother. Although the hospital's administrator supported this proposal, the application was denied, with the prosecutor's office citing overwhelming public opposition as a factor in their decision. Mandatory hearings as to whether Unruh should remain confined at Trenton Psychiatric Hospital or transferred to a less secure facility were held annually, although each hearing concluded he should remain confined at Trenton Psychiatric Hospital.

In the decades following his committal and prior to his death, Unruh's physical and mental health deteriorated considerably as he became increasingly institutionalized. A 1980 psychiatric report concluded thus: "Over the years, [Unruh's] mental condition has deteriorated greatly. His physical condition has also deteriorated and he has aged far beyond what would be expected merely by the number of years that have passed."

=== Death ===
Unruh remained incarcerated at Trenton Psychiatric Hospital until his death in October 2009 at the age of 88. At the time of his death, he was the oldest individual incarcerated in New Jersey. Although Unruh reportedly developed extreme remorse for his crimes in the decades prior to his death, one of his last public statements prior to his committal, spoken during an interview with a psychologist, was: "I'd have killed a thousand if I'd had bullets enough."

== Aftermath ==
The evening following the Camden shootings, the individual or individuals who had stolen the security gate to Unruh's back yard in the early hours of September 6 discreetly returned the gate to the property. The identity of the individual(s) responsible for this act of theft has never been ascertained.

Shortly after the Camden shootings, the United States federal government announced an increase in pre-existing resources and mental health care for World War II veterans.

A 4,000-word article penned by New York Times journalist Meyer Berger, Veteran Kills 12 in Mad Rampage on Camden Street, subsequently won the 1950 Pulitzer Prize for Local Reporting. Berger donated the $1,000 prize money he received for this award to Unruh's mother.

One of the survivors of the Camden shootings, Charles Cohen, spent much of his adult life campaigning to ensure that Unruh would remain confined until his death. Charles Cohen died of a stroke on September 4, 2009 at the age of 72, just one month before Unruh's own death. Cohen was buried on the sixtieth anniversary of the murder spree. (Note: Charles Cohen's 17-year-old granddaughter, Carly Rachel Novell, survived the 2018 Parkland high school shooting. As had been the case with her grandfather, Novell also escaped injury by hiding in a closet.)

== Media ==
=== Bibliography ===
- Green, Ellen (2022). Murder in the Neighborhood: The True Story of America's First Recorded Mass Shooting. London: Thread Books. ISBN 978-1-800-19807-4.
- Lloyd, Georgina (1993) [1986]. One Was Not Enough: True Stories of Multiple Murderers. New York: Bantam Books. pp. 20–28. ISBN 978-0-553-17605-6.
- Pender, Patrick (1994). "Crazed Veteran Slaughters Thirteen". Real-Life Crimes (84). London, England: Eaglemoss Publications Ltd.: 1844–1849. ISBN 978-1-856-29970-1.
- Wilson, Colin (1993). Murder in the 1940s. New York City: Caroll & Graf Publishers Inc. pp. 243–256. ISBN 978-0-881-84962-2.

=== Podcast ===
- "Howard Unruh and the Walk of Death" (2017). Hosted by Esther Ludlow. Released as part of the Once Upon A Crime podcast series.

== See also ==
- Criminal insanity – Legal concept regarding a defendant's state of mind
- Dementia praecox – Obsolete medical term for the schizophrenia and autism spectrums
- Gun violence in the United States
- List of massacres in New Jersey
- List of rampage killers in the United States
- Mass shootings in the United States – Incidents involving multiple victims of firearm violence
- Persecution complex – Delusion involving perception of persecution
- Post traumatic stress disorder – Mental disorder associated with trauma

== Cited works and further reading ==
- Alumni, Nieman (1949). Nieman Reports. Massachusetts: Nieman Foundation at Harvard University.
- Carducci, Bernardo J. (2009). The Psychology of Personality: Viewpoints, Research, and Applications. New Jersey: Wiley-Blackwell. ISBN 978-1-405-13635-8.
- Cawthorne, Nigel; Tibballs, Geoff (1993). Killers. London: Boxtree. pp. 156–163. ISBN 0-7522-0850-0.
- Duwe, Grant (2007). Mass Murder in the United States: A History. North Carolina: McFarland & Company. ISBN 978-0-786-43150-2.
- Fischer, Erika; Fischer, Heinz-Dietrich (2011). Local Reporting 1947-1987: From a County Vote Fraud to a Corrupt City Council. Munich: K. G. Saur Verlag. ISBN 978-3-110-97230-6.
- Foreman, Laura (1992). Mass Murderers: True Crime. New York: Time-Life Books. ISBN 0-7835-0004-1.
- Franscell, Ron (2011). Delivered from Evil: True Stories of Ordinary People Who Faced Monstrous Mass Killers and Survived. Massacheusetts: Fair Winds Press. ISBN 978-1-592-33440-7.
- Freedman, Morris (1963). Fact and Object. New York City: Harper & Row.
- Hickey, Eric (2003). Encyclopedia of Murder and Violent Crime. London: Sage Publications. ISBN 0-7619-2437-X.
- Jeffers, H. Paul (1992). Profiles in Evil: Chilling Case Histories from the Files of the FBI's Violent Crime Unit. United States: Warner Publishing. ISBN 978-0-751-50778-2.
- Kelleher, Michael D. (1997). Flash Point: The American Mass Murderer. London: Bloomsbury Academic. ISBN 978-0-275-95925-8.
- Lane, Brian (1995) [1993]. Chronicle of 20th Century Murder. Wiltshire: Select Editions. ISBN 978-0-425-14649-1.
- Lane, Brian; Gregg, Wilfred (1994). The Encyclopedia of Mass Murder. London: Headline Publishing. ISBN 978-0-747-20897-6.
- Leyton, Elliott (2011) [1986]. Hunting Humans: The Rise Of The Modern Multiple Murderer. Toronto: McClelland & Stewart. pp. 20–28. ISBN 978-0-140-11687-8.
- Mayo, Michael (2008). American Murder: Criminals, Crimes, and the Media. Michigan: Visible Ink Press. ISBN 978-1-578-59227-2.
- Nash, Jay Robert (2004). The Great Pictorial History of World Crime. London: Bloomsbury Publishing. ISBN 979-8-216-31655-8.
- Ressler, Robert K.; Burgess, Ann W.; Douglas, John E. (1995). Sexual Homicide: Patterns and Motives. New York City: Free Press. ISBN 978-0-028-74063-8.
- Safarik, Mark; Ramsland, Katherine (2019). Spree Killers: Practical Classifications for Law Enforcement and Criminology. Oxfordshire: Taylor & Francis. ISBN 978-1-000-72745-6.
- Schechter, Harold (2008). True Crime: An American Anthology. A Library of America Special Publication. New York: Library of America. ISBN 978-1-598-53031-5.
- Schildkraut, Jaclyn (2018). Mass Shootings in America: Understanding the Debates, Causes, and Responses. Santa Barbara: ABC-CLIO. ISBN 978-1-440-85624-2.
- Tomlinson, Gerald (1994). Murdered in Jersey. New Jersey: Rutgers University Press. ISBN 978-0-813-52078-0.
