= Patton, California =

Unincorporated community in California, United States

- Unincorporated community
- Location within California Location within the United States
- Coordinates: 34°08′09″N 117°13′26″W
- Country: United States
- State: California
- County: San Bernardino
- Elevation: 1,283 ft (391 m)
- Time zone: UTC-8 (Pacific (PST))
  - Summer (DST): UTC-7 (PDT)
- ZIP code: 92369
- Area code: 909
- GNIS feature ID: 1661200

Patton is a former unincorporated community in San Bernardino County, California, United States, now part of the city of San Bernardino. It is 4.5 miles (7.2 km) northeast of downtown San Bernardino. Patton has a post office which opened in 1897 and now has the ZIP code 92369.

The community originated with the construction of the Southern California Asylum for the Insane and Inebriates within what was then Highland Township, and included a train depot established prior to its opening in 1893. The depot, originally named "Asylum", was a stop on the Southern California Railroad's "Kite-Shaped Track". Around 1897, the facility changed its name to the "Southern California Hospital for the Insane" and the railroad changed the station's name to "Patton", after H. W. Patton, a journalist and original member of the hospital's board of managers. The facility itself eventually changed its name to Patton State Hospital.
