= Henry Cotton (doctor) =

American psychiatrist (1869/76–1933)

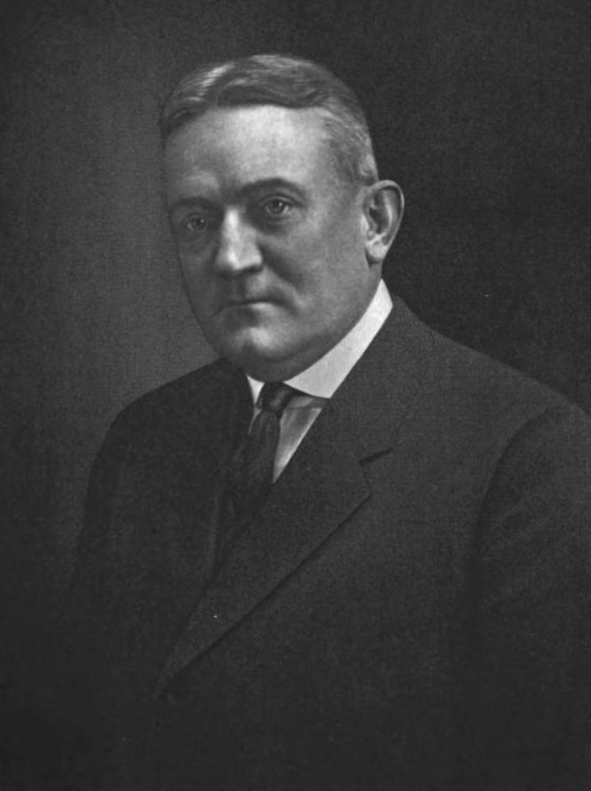
- Born: Henry Andrews Cotton; May 18, 1876; Norfolk, Virginia
- Died: May 8, 1933 (aged 56); Trenton, New Jersey
- Occupation: Psychiatrist

Signature
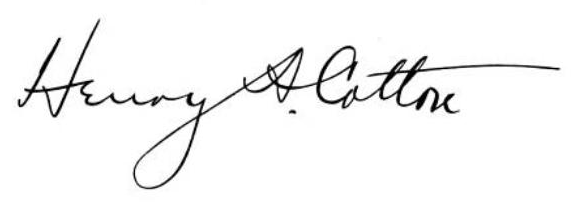

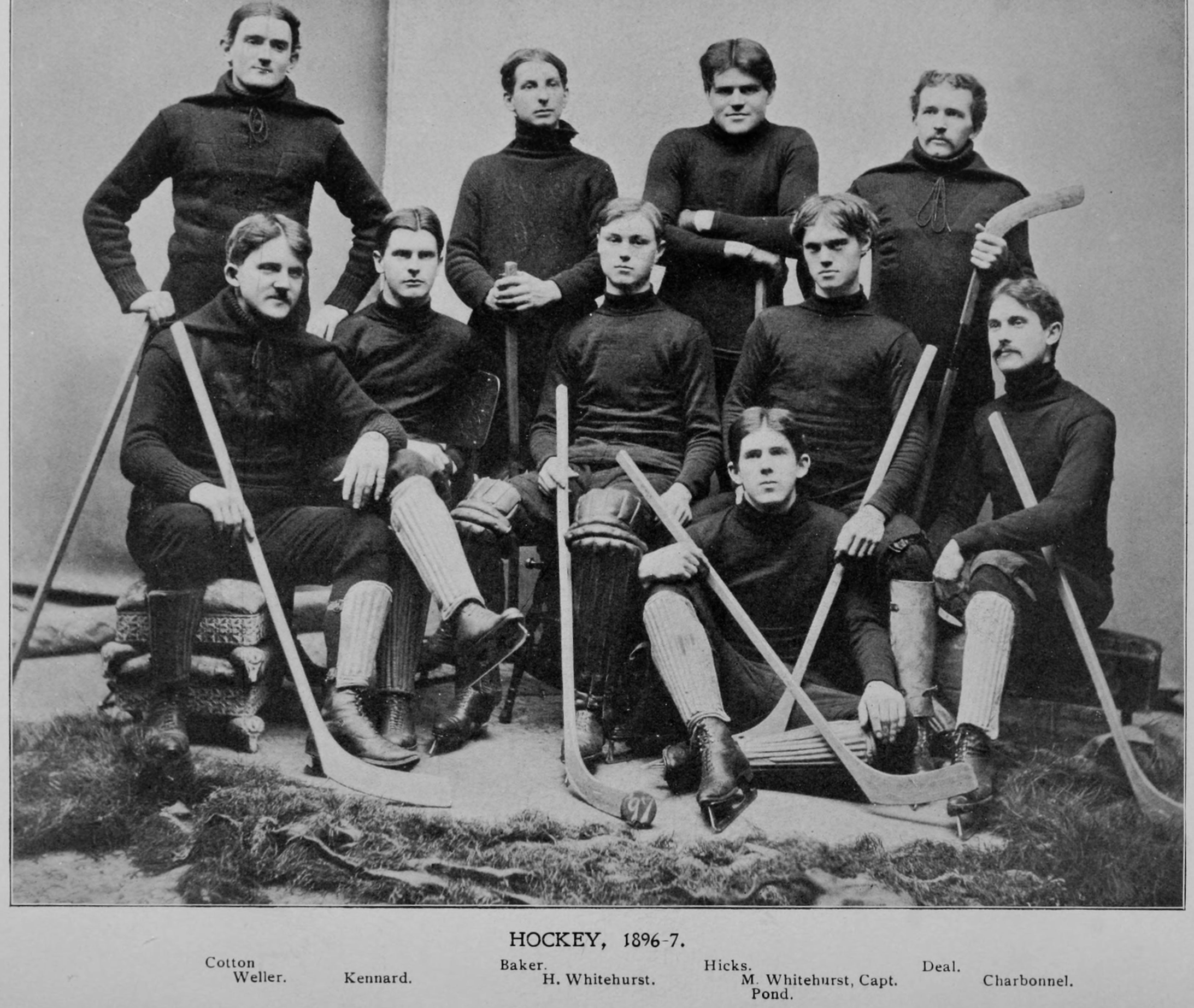
Henry Cotton, at the top left corner, with the ice hockey team of the University of Maryland during the 1896–1897 season

Henry Andrews Cotton (May 19, 1869 or May 18, 1876 – May 8, 1933) was an American psychiatrist and the medical director of the New Jersey State Hospital at Trenton (now Trenton Psychiatric Hospital), in Trenton, New Jersey. During his tenure from 1907 to 1930, Cotton and his staff employed experimental surgery and bacteriology techniques on patients, which included the routine removal of some or all of patients' teeth, tonsils, spleens, colons, ovaries, and other organs. These pseudoscientific practices persisted even after statistical reviews disproved Cotton's claims of high cure rates and revealed high mortality rates as a result of these procedures.

Cotton became the medical director of the New Jersey State Hospital at Trenton at the age of 30. As director, Cotton implemented changes to how the hospital operated, such as abolishing mechanical restraints, and requiring daily staff meetings to discuss outpatient care. Cotton was motivated by the new medical research of the 20th century, and believed that various mental illnesses were caused by untreated infections in the body. This theory, called biological psychiatry, was introduced to him by Dr. Adolf Meyer, and contrasted the eugenic theories of the era that emphasized heredity. At the time, Cotton was a leading practitioner of biological psychiatry in the United States.

== Education and career ==
Henry A. Cotton studied in Europe under Emil Kraepelin and Alois Alzheimer, who were considered the pioneers of the day. He also was a student of Dr. Adolf Meyer of Johns Hopkins School of Medicine, who dominated American psychiatry in the early 1900s. He studied medicine at Johns Hopkins University and at University of Maryland.

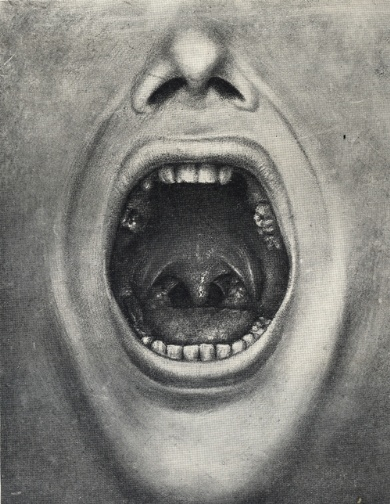
Illustration of a mouth with teeth removed from Cotton's book The defective delinquent and insane: the relation of focal infections to their causation, treatment and prevention.

Cotton began to implement the emerging medical theory of infection-based psychological disorders by pulling patients' teeth, as they were suspected of harboring infections. If this did not cure a patient, he sought sources of infection in tonsils and sinuses and often recommended a tonsillectomy as additional treatment. If a cure was not achieved after these procedures, other organs were suspected of harboring infection. Testicles, ovaries, gall bladders, stomachs, spleens, cervixes, and especially colons were suspected as the focus of infection and were removed surgically.

As this occurred before the existence of rudimentary scientific methods such as control groups—and by extension, double-blind experiments—statistical methodology for applications in human behavior and medical research did not emerge during Cotton's lifetime. He could only follow faulty methods to compile data, much of it allowing for projection of anticipated results. He reported wonderful success with his procedures, with cure rates of 85%; this, in conjunction with the feeling at the time that investigating such biological causes was the state of the art of medicine, brought him much attention and worldwide praise. He was honored at medical institutions and associations in the United States, the United Kingdom, and Europe and asked to make presentations about his work and share information with others who practiced the same or similar methods. Patients, or their families, sought treatment at Trenton, and those who could not demanded their own doctors treat them with these new treatments. The state acknowledged the savings in expenses to taxpayers from the new treatments and cures. In June 1922, the New York Times wrote in a review of Cotton's published lectures:

At the State Hospital at Trenton, N.J., under the brilliant leadership of the medical director, Dr. Henry A. Cotton, there is on foot the most searching, aggressive, and profound scientific investigation that has yet been made of the whole field of mental and nervous disorders... there is hope, high hope... for the future.

In an era before antibiotics, surgery resulted in a very high rate of postoperative morbidity and mortality, largely from postoperative infection. Among his patients was Margaret Fisher, daughter of wealthy and famed Yale economist Irving Fisher, who believed in the hygienic movement of the period. Diagnosed by physicians in Bloomingdale Asylum as schizophrenic before the modern development of some pharmaceutical agents, Fisher had his daughter transferred to Trenton. However, because Cotton attributed her condition to a "marked retention of fecal matter in the cecal colon with marked enlargement of the colon in this area", she was subjected to a series of colonic surgeries before dying of streptococcal infection in 1919. The danger of surgery was recognized by some patients in the institution, who, despite their mental illness, developed a very rational fear of the surgical procedures, some resisting violently as they were forced into the operating theater in complete contradiction to what are now commonly accepted medical ethics. A paternalistic attitude and the permission of the family of seriously insane patients were the basis of intervention at the time.

Differences of professional opinion existed among psychiatrists regarding focal sepsis as a cause of psychosis, and not all believed in the benefits of surgical intervention to achieve cures. Dr. Meyer, head of the most respected psychiatric clinic and training institution for psychiatrists in the United States, at Johns Hopkins University, accepted the theory. He was encouraged by a like-minded member of the state board of trustees who oversaw Trenton State Hospital to provide an independent professional review of the work of Cotton's staff. Meyer commissioned another of his former students who practiced psychiatry on his staff at the Phipps Clinic, Dr. Phyllis Greenacre, to critique Cotton's work. Her study began in the fall of 1924, just after Meyer visited the hospital and privately expressed concern about the statistical methods being applied to provide an assessment of Cotton's work. Cotton's staff made no effort to facilitate the study.

=== Investigation and controversy ===
From the outset, Greenacre's reports were critical of the hospital, which she felt was as unwholesome as the typical asylum, and Cotton, whom she found "singularly peculiar". She realized that the appearance and behavior of almost all of the psychotic patients were disturbing to her because their teeth had been removed, making it difficult for them to eat or speak. Further reports cast serious doubt on Cotton's reported results; Greenacre found the staff records chaotic and the data internally contradictory. In 1925, criticism of the hospital reached the New Jersey State Senate, which launched an investigation with testimony from unhappy former patients and hospital employees. Countering the criticism, the hospital trustees confirmed their confidence in the staff and director and presented extensive professional praise of the hospital and the procedures followed under the direction of Cotton, whom they considered a pioneer. On September 24, 1925, The New York Times stated that, "eminent physicians and surgeons testified that the New Jersey State Hospital for the Insane was the most progressive institution in the world for the care of the insane and that the newer method of treating the insane by the removal of focal infection placed the institution in a unique position with respect to hospitals for the mentally ill", and related accolades given in support of Henry A. Cotton by many professionals and politicians.

Soon Cotton opened a private hospital in Trenton that did a hugely lucrative business treating mentally ill members of rich families seeking the most modern treatments for their conditions. Meyer reassigned Greenacre without completing her report and resisted her efforts to complete it. Admitting a shared belief in the possibility that focal sepsis might be the source of mental illness, Meyer never pressed his protégé to confront the scientific analysis of the erroneous statistics the hospital staff provided to Cotton, his silence guaranteeing the continuance of the practices. Later Cotton occasionally admitted to death rates as high as 30% in his published papers. It appears the true death rates were closer to 45% and that Cotton never fully recognized the errors his staff made in analyzing his work.

In the early 1930s, Cotton's rate of postoperative mortality became a matter of professional debate in the state department of institutions, with some concerned that he intended to press to resume his position at the state hospital. Another report on Cotton's work began in 1932 by Emil Frankel. He noted that he saw Greenacre's report and agreed with it substantially, but his report also was never completed.

In October 1930, Cotton was retired from the state hospital and was appointed medical director emeritus. Although this ended the surgeries which were so dangerous before the discovery of antibiotics, the hospital continued to adhere to Cotton's humane treatment guidelines and conduct his less risky medical procedures until the late 1950s. Henry A. Cotton continued to direct the staff at Charles Hospital until his death.

Henry A. Cotton died suddenly of a heart attack on May 8, 1933, in Trenton, New Jersey and was lauded in The New York Times and the local press, as well as international professional publications, for being a pioneer seeking a better path for treatment of patients in mental hospitals.

== In popular culture ==
A fictionalized Dr. Cotton was portrayed by actor John Hodgman in the Cinemax drama The Knick in 2014.

He is portrayed by Byron Jennings in the fifth season of Boardwalk Empire. The show incorrectly shows him being active in 1931, by which point the real Cotton was already retired.

The story of Dr. Cotton was subjected to comedic treatment on the podcast The Dollop episode 290.

== See also ==
- Acres of Skin
- Wilhelm Fliess
- Bayard Holmes
- The Plutonium Files
- The Protest Psychosis: How Schizophrenia Became a Black Disease
- Unethical human experimentation in the United States
