= Andrew Scull =

British sociologist (born 1947)

Andrew T. Scull
- Born: 1947 (age 78–79); Edinburgh, Scotland
- Education: Balliol College, Oxford (BA); Princeton University (PhD)
- Occupations: Professor of Sociology and Science Studies, University of California, San Diego
- Known for: Writings on the social history of psychiatry

Andrew T. Scull (born 1947) is a British-born sociologist who researches the social history of medicine and the history of psychiatry. He is a distinguished professor of sociology and science studies at University of California, San Diego, and recipient of the Roy Porter Medal for lifetime contributions to the history of medicine. His books include Madhouse: A Tragic Tale of Megalomania and Modern Medicine, Madness in Civilization: A Cultural History of Insanity, and Desperate Remedies: Psychiatry's Turbulent Quest to Cure Mental Illness.

== Life and career ==
Scull was born in Edinburgh, Scotland, the son of Allan Edward Scull, a civil engineer and Marjorie née Corrigan, a college teacher. He received his BA with first-class honors from Balliol College, Oxford. He then studied at Princeton University, receiving his MA in sociology in 1971 and his Ph.D. in 1974. He was a postdoc at University College London in 1976–77.

Scull taught at the University of Pennsylvania from 1973 until 1978, when he was appointed to the sociology faculty at University of California, San Diego, as an associate professor. He was appointed a full professor in 1982, and distinguished professor in 1994.

== Books ==
Scull's first book, Decarceration: Community Treatment and the Deviant – A Radical View was published in 1977 by Prentice-Hall. A revised version of his Princeton doctoral dissertation, Museums of Madness: The Social Organization of Insanity in 19th Century England, was published in 1979 by Allen Lane (London) and St. Martin's Press (New York). Scull's later books include Madhouse: A Tragic Tale of Megalomania and Modern Medicine (Yale University Press, 2005), Hysteria: The Biography (Oxford University Press, 2009), (Note: The 2011 paperback version was titled Hysteria: The Disturbing History)Madness in Civilization: A Cultural History of Insanity (Princeton University Press, 2015), and Desperate Remedies: Psychiatry's Turbulent Quest to Cure Mental Illness (The Belknap Press, 2022).

== 2009 Letter to the UC Regents ==
In the summer of 2009, Scull authored a letter to the University of California Regents that called for reallocation of funding from the Riverside, Santa Cruz, and Merced campuses to make up for budget shortfalls at what he deemed "higher tiered" campuses, stating that rather than being research heavy institutions and thus draws for grant and philanthropic moneys, "UCSC, UCR and UC Merced are in substantial measure teaching institutions" and that "[i]f we don't do this, we will end up with a bunch of mediocre U.C.'s instead of great U.C.'s." Then UC President Mark Yudoff dismissed the proposal outright in a statement released to all UC campus chancellors, but not before critics noted the demographic differences between UCSD and the campuses Scull and his 22 co-signatories targeted.
