= Nathan Trupp =

American serial killer

- Born: Nathan Nicholas Trupp; 1947 (age 78–79)
- Conviction: Murder
- Penalty: Committed to a psychiatric hospital

Details
- Victims: 5
- Span of crimes: 1988–1988
- Country: United States
- State: New Mexico

Nathan Nicholas Trupp (born 1947) is an American serial killer. He murdered five victims in New Mexico and California.

== 1988 Murder Spree ==
On November 29, 1988 - Trupp's 43rd birthday, he took a cab and purchased a .38-caliber snub-nosed revolver at a local gun shop. The same cab driver then took him to Tijeras Canyon, a short 10 minute drive outside of town, where he practiced firing the weapon while the driver waited. After this, he requested to be taken to the Monzano Shopping center in Eastern Albuquerque, New Mexico. While driving there, the cab driver reported that Trupp began talking about a bagel shop near his apartment which he frequented but noted it had gone 'bad' and had served him poisoned bagels.

Upon arriving at the shopping center, he entered the Bagel Lovers store and fatally shot Jeanne Wilt, 37, and her father, Joseph Famiglietta, 63, who operated the family business. As Jeanne's husband, Richard Wilt, 39, pursued Trupp out of the front door, Trupp shot and killed him, too. Two customers who were present were able to flee, and police later noted that Trupp seemed to "only want the people who worked there".

After the murders, Trupp returned to his Albuquerque apartment to spend the night. The next morning, on November 30, 1988, he paid his rent and was able to disappear shortly before a police SWAT team arrived to apprehend him. As the manhunt developed across Albuquerque, Trupp boarded a bus bound for Los Angeles.

After the ~10 hour journey, Trupp checked into the Hollywood Land Motel on Ventura Boulevard, within walking distance of Universal Studios.

The next day, on December 1, 1988, Trupp visited Universal Studios, taking the studio tour and repeatedly asking employees for access to actor Michael Landon, whom he reportedly believed to be a Nazi. Landon was not present at the studio and was not under contract there at the time. At approximately 5:45 p.m., Trupp approached the main gate, where he asked two unarmed Burns International Security guards, Jeren Beeks, 27, and Armando Enrique Torres,18, if he could use their phone to contact Landon. The guards told him to use a nearby pay phone.

Trupp briefly left, only to return and open fire on the guard shack the two guards were in, instantly killing Beeks and fatally wounding Torres, who would die the following day at St. Joseph Medical Center. As Trupp attempted to leave the scene, a security guard flagged down a Los Angeles Sheriff's deputy who confronted Trupp. After a brief gun battle which left Trupp with two gunshot wounds, one to the chest and another to his arm, he was taken into custody and hospitalized for his injuries. While being treated, he repeatedly claimed "It wasn't my fault, I was told to do it" and told a paramedic that God had instructed him to shoot.

Afterwards, Trupp was charged with a total of five counts of murder - three in New Mexico for the Bagel Lovers murders and two in California for the Hollywood Studios murders. During his trial, Trupp's extensive history of mental illness, including delusions that his victims were Nazis and that he was acting on divine instruction, became a central focus.

He was initially found incompetent to stand trial by Los Angeles Superior Court Judge Florence Bernstein, based on psychiatric evaluations that had found he was unable to rationally cooperate with his legal counsel and suffered from hallucinations and emotional outbursts. He was ordered to Patton State Hospital in San Bernardino County, California, where he was to remain until his competency was restored.

In May 1990, Judge Clarence A. Stromwall accepted his original plea of not guilty by reason of insanity, and he was formally committed to Patton State Hospital.
