= Curt Richter =

American biologist and geneticist

Curt Paul Richter
- Born: 20 February 1894; Denver, Colorado, United States
- Died: 21 December 1988 (aged 94); Baltimore, Maryland
- Education: Harvard University; Johns Hopkins University
- Awards: Karl Spencer Lashley Award (1980)

Curt Paul Richter (February 20, 1894 – December 21, 1988) was an American biologist, psychobiologist and geneticist who made important contributions in the field of circadian rhythms. Notably, Richter identified the hypothalamus as a "biological pacemaker" involved in sleeping and wakefulness. In particular, this region suspected by Richter was later identified as the suprachiasmatic nucleus.

== Early life, family and education ==
Richter was born on February 20, 1894, in Denver, Colorado, to German immigrants from Saxony, Germany. Richter's father was an engineer who owned a steel and iron firm in Denver.

In 1912, Richter studied engineering at a Technische Hochschule in Germany, but he left after the outbreak of World War I in 1914, switching to Harvard University where he studied biology under William E. Castle. Due to Richter's lack of experience with biology, Castle advised that he drop the course, so he switched to psychology instead, studying under E. B. Holt and Robert Yerkes. He graduated from Harvard in 1917 and, after a brief tour in the United States Army, studied under John Watson at Johns Hopkins University.

== Work ==
Richter induced need states in experimental animals by depriving them of substances essential to survival, or manipulating their hormone levels. He showed that these need states generate appetites, and behaviors precisely fitting the animal's need even if the animal had never before experienced the need; demonstrating genetic programming of behavior. He also triggered other pre-programmed behaviors, such as nest building, by manipulating hormone levels.

== Awards and honors ==
Richter received the Howard Crosby Warren Medal of the Society of Experimental Psychologists in 1950. the APA Award for Distinguished Scientific Contributions to Psychology in 1957, and the Karl Spencer Lashley Award of the American Philosophical Society in 1980.

Richter was elected to the United States National Academy of Sciences in 1948, the American Academy of Arts and Sciences in 1956, and the American Philosophical Society in 1959.

The International Society of Psychoneuroendocrinology established the Curt P. Richter Prize in his honor in 1979, funded by the Irish Foundation for Human Development, to recognize an outstanding manuscript by a younger scientist in psychoneuroendocrinology. Now known as the Dirk Hellhammer Award following a 2021 renaming, the prize is awarded annually to an early-career investigator in psychoneuroendocrinology.

== In popular culture ==
Richter is quoted widely for his drowning rat experiments, where rats would drown in a fairly short time without attempting to swim. But if rats had repeated experiences of rescue (or of being held briefly and then freed) they "do not die", and "show no signs of giving up". As described in the paper:

Support for the assumption that the sudden death phenomenon depends largely on emotional reactions to restraint or immersion comes from the observation that after elimination of the hopelessness the rats do not die. This is achieved by repeatedly holding the rats briefly and then freeing them, and by immersing them in water for a few minutes on several occasions. In this way the rats quickly learn that the situation is not actually hopeless; thereafter they again become aggressive, try to escape, and show no signs of giving up. Wild rats so conditioned swim just as long as domestic rats or longer.

This has been interpreted as an argument for the importance of hope and recirculates on the Internet regularly.
