= Association for the Advancement of Psychotherapy =

American professional organization

The Association for the Advancement of Psychotherapy (AAP) is a professional organization created to advance methods of psychotherapy among members of the medical profession and to familiarize members with progress in the field. Organized in 1939, Association for the Advancement of Psychotherapy publishes the quarterly American Journal of Psychotherapy.

Their 1954 annual meeting was the site of an emerging debate between Harry Benjamin and AAP co-founder Emil Gutheil over the causes and treatment of transsexualism, with Gutheil advocating an environmental cause and therapy to dissuade pursuit of medical options.

In 2001 the organization subsumed the Journal of Psychotherapy Practice and Research into its journal. The organization is currently based at the Albert Einstein College of Medicine in New York, New York.
