= Herdshare =

Contractual arrangement in farming

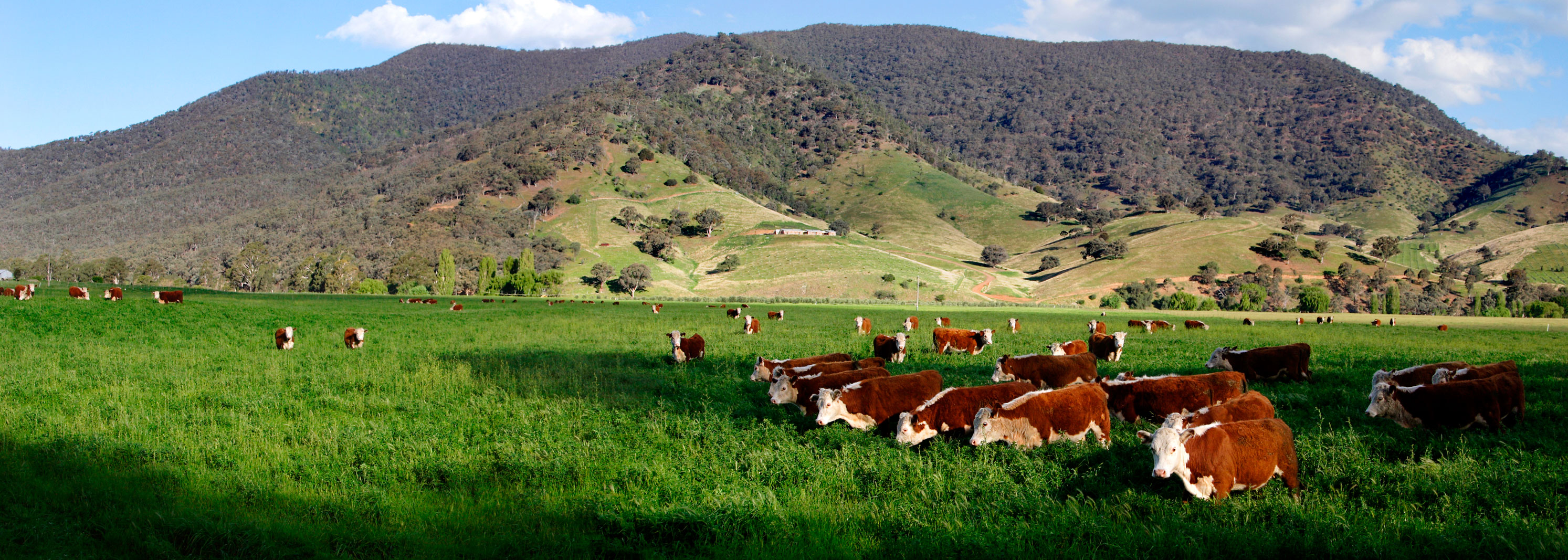
Cows in green field - Nullamunjie Olive Grove in Tongio, Australia

A herdshare is a contractual arrangement between a farmer and an owner of livestock - the shareholder or member - through which the shareholder is able to obtain raw milk, meat, offal and other profits of the livestock proportionate to the shareholder's interest in the herd. Herdshares include cowshares, goatshares, and sheepshares, and are sometime referred to as "farmshares" or "dairy-shares," although the term "farmshare" can also refer to an entire farm (buildings, land, equipment, etc.) held in joint ownership.

A herdshare enables consumers to obtain raw (unpasteurized) milk in a jurisdiction that may otherwise prohibit the sale of raw milk. Parties may also choose to enter into herdshare agreements even in jurisdictions that do permit some type of raw milk sale because a herdshare may provide a more economically secure business model for a dairy farmer than conventional dairy farming otherwise would provide for.

== Terms of the herdshare agreement ==
Under the terms of a herdshare agreement, the shareholder purchases a share of a dairy farmer's herd and receives a portion of either the product or the profit of the herd proportionate to the shareholder's corresponding interest. Unlike a direct sale of raw milk for consideration, a shareholder pays a one-time fee in exchange for her undivided interest in the herd. This is the purchase agreement or the bill of sale. In addition to the bill of sale, the shareholder pays a monthly boarding fee (or "agistment fee") that covers the farmer's cost for labor and maintenance of the herd.

For example, if the farmer has one cow valued at $800, the shareholder may purchase a 1/25 undivided interest in the herd (or here, a single cow) for $32.00. The parties would execute a bill of sale transferring a 1/25 ownership stake in the cow from the farmer to the shareholder in exchange for $32.00. If the cow produces 30 gallons of milk per week, the shareholder may choose to receive up to 1 and a 1/5 gallons of milk per week (30 gallons of milk divided by 25 possible shares). If the cow is slaughtered, then the shareholder may also be entitled to 1/25 of the meat or the value of the meat. If the cow is shown at a competition and wins a prize, the shareholder may choose to receive up to 1/25 of the value of that award.

In addition to both the bill of sale and the boarding fee, the herdshare agreement may include terms for a trial period, collection and storage of the milk, care of the herd, maintenance of the farm, liability, default, and risk of loss. Terms for the boarding, care of the herd, and handling of the milk may be separate documents.

== History of herdshares ==
=== Agistment ===
Advocates of herdshare arrangements argue that herdsharing is rooted in the common law tradition of agistment. Agistment is "a type of bailment in which a person, for a fee, allows animals to graze on his or her pasture." References to agistment in England can be traced as far back as 1305. Agistment is still practiced in the countries that make up the Commonwealth of Nations and in the western United States primarily for the grazing of beef cattle (and sometimes sheep).

Herdshare advocates maintain that the dairy farmer operating a herdshare is merely an "agister" who holds the cows in bailment for the cow's owners, the shareholders. However, some courts in the United States reject this interpretation of the herdshare agreement refusing to find that the shareholder has a legitimate claim to ownership in the herd; rather, those courts have found that the shareholder merely has a claim to the milk produced by the herd and that as such the agreement constitutes an unlawful exchange of consideration for raw milk.

=== In the United States ===
The Weston A. Price Foundation, an organization that encourages raw milk consumption and advocates for increased consumer access to raw milk, claims that the first example of an arrangement bearing some similarity to a herdshare occurred in 1627 when Captain Myles Standish of the Plymouth Colony purchased a 1/6 share of a "red cow."

The first herdshare began in the United States in 1995 in Loveland, Colorado at Guidestone CSA Farm and Center for Sustainable Living. In 2013, the Weston A. Price Foundation listed 365 herdshares operating in 31 states.

State	No. of Herdshares	Notes	State	No. of Herdshares	Notes
Alabama	2	No law for or against it	Montana	0	Sale prohibited
Alaska	6	Herdshares tolerated	Nebraska	0	On farm sales permitted
Arizona	1	Retail sale permitted	Nevada	1	Sale prohibited
Arkansas	1	Limited on farm sales permitted	New Hampshire	3	Retail sale permitted
California	6	Retail sale permitted	New Jersey	1	Sale prohibited
Colorado	35	Herdshares permitted	New Mexico	2	Retail sale permitted
Connecticut	0	Retail sale permitted	New York	2	On farm sale permitted
Delaware	0	Sale prohibited	North Carolina	0	Sale restricted to pet food
Florida	0	Herdshares prohibited	North Dakota	2	Herdshares permitted
Georgia	2	Sale prohibited (pet food exception)	Ohio	25	Retail sale prohibited; herdshares tolerated
Hawaii	0	Sales prohibited	Oklahoma	0	On farm sales permitted
Idaho	1	Herdshares permitted	Oregon	17	Limited on farms sales permitted
Illinois	5	On farm sales permitted	Pennsylvania	2	Retail sale permitted
Indiana	23	Sale prohibited (herdshares tolerated)	Rhode Island	0	Sale prohibited
Iowa	0	Sale prohibited	South Carolina	0	Retail sale permitted
Kansas	2	On farm sale permitted	South Dakota	0	On farm sales permitted
Kentucky	18	Goat milk available with prescription	Tennessee	43	Herdshares permitted
Louisiana	0	Herdshares prohibited	Texas	13	On farm sales permitted
Maine	1	Retail sale permitted	Utah	0	On farm sales permitted, but herdshares prohibited
Maryland	0	Herdshares prohibited	Vermont	2	On farm sales permitted
Massachusetts	1	Retail sale permitted	Virginia	88	Sale prohibited
Michigan	55	Herdshares permitted	Washington	1	Retail sale permitted
Minnesota	1	On farm sales permitted	West Virginia	0	Herdshares prohibited
Mississippi	0	Limited on farm sale of goat milk permitted	Wisconsin	0	On farm sales permitted
Missouri	1	On farm sale permitted	Wyoming	3	Herdshares tolerated

== Motivation for participating in herdshares ==
Researchers at Michigan State University Department of Large Animal Clinical Studies interviewed 56 individuals all of whom obtained raw milk for personal consumption through a herdshare arrangement. Shareholders drove an average of 24 miles approximately 4 times per month to pick up their raw milk from the farm. Half of the respondents lived in the "country" while the remainder lived in the suburbs or the city. 64% of respondents had a bachelor's degree or higher. 91% of respondents believed that raw milk is healthier than pasteurized milk and nearly 80% disagreed with the claim that drinking raw milk would increase their risk of contracting a foodborne illness. Virtually all respondents had visited the farm where their milk was produced. Respondents drink raw milk for the following reasons:

Reason for consuming raw milk	%
Taste	83.9%
Immune-related disease prevention	60.7%
Doesn't feel processed milk is safe	57.1%
Supports local farms	85.7%
Holistic health benefits	76.8%

== Legal status of herdshares in the United States ==
No jurisdiction in the United States bans either the production or the consumption of raw milk. However, a few states restrict to varying degrees the sale of raw milk. Twelve states in the United States permit herdshare arrangements via legislation, regulation, policy, or court decision:

State:	Legal by:	Citation:
Alaska	statute	Alaska Administrative Code 32.010(c)
Colorado	statute	Colorado Revised Statutes, 25-5.5-117. Raw milk
Connecticut	statute	Senate Bill 360, 2015 Session
Idaho	statute	Idaho Statutes, Title 37, Ch. 11 - Acquisition of Raw Milk
Michigan	policy	Michigan Department of Agriculture and Rural Development, Policy 1.40
North Dakota	statute	North Dakota Century Code, Ch. 40-30
Ohio	court decision	Schmitmeyer vs. Ohio Department of Agriculture, Case No 06-CV-63277
Utah	statute	Utah Code, Title 4, Ch. 3 Utah Dairy Act
Tennessee	statute	Tennessee State Code, 53-3-119 Use of milk from hoofed mammal for owner's personal consumption or use.
Wyoming	regulation	Wyoming Food Safety Rule, Chapter 3 Food Care, Section 8, Fluid Milk and Milk Products
West Virginia	statute	West Virginia Code, §19-1-7. Shared animal ownership agreement to consume raw milk.
Washington	statute	Washington State Code, 15.36.012

=== Federal law ===
The federal government of the United States prohibits the interstate sale or transfer of raw milk.

No person shall cause to be delivered into interstate commerce or shall sell, otherwise distribute, or hold for sale or other distribution after shipment in interstate commerce any milk or milk product in final package form for direct human consumption [that has not been pasteurized].

While not expressly prohibiting herdshares, the language "otherwise distribute... in interstate commerce" would appear to bar herdshares from operating across state lines. Indeed, in 2012, the U.S. District Court for the Eastern District of Pennsylvania convicted a dairy farmer for unlawfully entering raw milk into interstate commerce. The farmer claimed to operate a herdshare. The court stated (in dicta) that the herdshare agreement here was

merely a subterfuge to create a transaction disguised as a sale of raw milk to consumers. The practical result of the arrangement is that consumers pay money to [the farmer] and receive raw milk, which is transported across state lines and left at a 'drop point.' As such, despite any artful language, the agreement involves the transfer of raw milk for consideration, which constitutes a sale and is lawfully regulated by the FDA.

Following this ruling, one noteworthy commentator speculated that the era of the herdshare agreement was nearing its end noting that raw milk activists would do better to pursue legislative rather than judicial strategies.

=== State laws ===
The regulatory power of the federal government does not currently extend to intrastate raw milk transactions. But at least one commentator has argued that the federal government may have authority to regulate the intrastate sale and transfer of raw milk in light of the Supreme Court's recent Commerce Clause jurisprudence.

46 of 50 states have adopted the Food and Drug Administration's Grade A Pasteurized Milk Ordinance (PMO), a uniform code of guidelines to promote the standardization of milk production. Section 9 of the PMO concerning the sale of raw milk reads in pertinent part:

[O]nly Grade “A” pasteurized, ultra-pasteurized, or aseptically processed and packaged milk and milk products shall be sold to the final consumer, to restaurants, soda fountains, grocery stores or similar establishments.

Several courts have interpreted the word "sale" in the PMO to preclude herdshares on the grounds that a herdshare is little more than an impermissible sale by another name. Nevertheless, herdshares continue to operate in states governed by the PMO.

==== State statutes ====
Not content to leave regulation of herdshares to either a court or agency interpretation of the PMO, seven states have supplemented the law with more precise language. Nine states currently permit herdshares through statute: Colorado, Connecticut, Idaho, North Carolina, North Dakota, Tennessee, Utah, Tennessee, West Virginia, and Wyoming. Nevada expressly prohibits milk herdshares by statute.

==== State regulations ====
One example of state regulations is found in Alaska, which permits the "owner" of the livestock to consume the milk of the animal. An example of how a court may determine ownership can be found in Slippy v. Northey below. Nevertheless, state officials in at least Alaska presume that the herdshare agreement vests ownership of a share of the herd in the shareholder.

Maryland prohibits herdsharing by regulation. The Court of Special Appeals of Maryland affirmed the state's prohibition of herdshares in its 2009 ruling in Ozaryo v. Maryland Dept. of Health and Mental Hygiene, et al.

==== State policy opinions ====
In 2013, the Michigan Department of Agriculture and Rural Development issued Policy # 1.40 stating that it would permit herdshare operations that include a signed agreement between the parties and allow for a "workable means of communication" between the farmer and the shareholders.

==== Court rulings ====
The Supreme Court of Virginia rejected a farmer's herdshare arrangement in its 1989 ruling in Kenley v. Solem. There, the farmer proposed to sell undivided interests in her goats for $50.00 per share plus a $3.00 daily maintenance fee that would entitle the shareholder to up to one gallon of milk per day. The court characterized this latter payment as merely a "sham payment for the gallon of milk received by the owner from [the defendant]." Virginia's administrative code at that time prohibited the sale of raw milk and milk products and still does to this day.

In spite of Virginia's regulatory code prohibiting raw milk sales and the Court's 1989 ruling, herdshares appear to be thriving in Virginia. Virginia's 88 herdshare operations listed on the Weston A. Price Foundation's Real Milk Finder webpage are the most of any state, even among those that statutorily permit herdsharing.

Herdshare activists heralded a 2006 Ohio trial court's ruling in Schmitmeyer v. Ohio Dept. of Agr. as permitting herdshares by precedent. There, the court rejected ODA's attempt to delicense a dairy producer for unlawfully selling raw milk to consumers. The dairy farmer claimed that she was operating a herdshare. The herdshare agreement required shareholders to pay a flat $50.00 fee in addition to a weekly $6.00 per week boarding fee that the shareholders paid when they picked up their milk. The court questioned ODA's "inexact practice" of permitting some owners (the farmers) to consume raw milk but not other owners. Ohio's law prohibits any "raw milk retailer" from selling or "exposing for sale raw milk to the final consumer."

In 2012, an Iowa trial court invalidated a herdshare agreement in Slippy v. Northey. There, the shareholder challenged the state's issuance of a cease and desist letter to a dairy farmer managing her herdshare. While the court initially found that the Plaintiff lacked standing to challenge the state's action, it nevertheless proceeded to rule on the merits. It found that the Plaintiff's herdshare agreement amounted to little more than a share in an interest in milk and that it lacked sufficient characteristics of a transfer of a legitimate property interest in a herd of cows. Iowa's law only permits the sale of "grade 'A' pasteurized milk and milk products... to the final consumer." 37 years earlier, the Iowa Supreme Court in Johnson County v. Guernsey Ass'n of Johnson County, Iowa, Inc. invalidated a corporate structure for the distribution of raw milk to the final consumers.

=== Criticism and defense of herdshares ===
In addition to the rejection of herdshare agreements by several courts, one commentator has gone so far as to state that referring to herdshare agreements as "a species of legal maneuvering may be giving too much credit to an effort that that is designed to flout the law entirely, or at the very least avoid the often stringent requirements associated with licensure."

Raw milk and herdshare advocates argue that individuals have a fundamental right to contract, or in the alternative, that individuals have a fundamental right to consume and grow the foods of their choice. Courts have rejected both of these arguments.

== Legal status of herdshares in Canada ==
=== Ongoing litigation in Ontario ===
In 2006, the government of Ontario filed charges against herdshare farmer, Michael Schmidt for violating both Section 18(1) of the Health Promotion and Protection Act which bars the sale and distribution of unpasteurized milk and Section 15(1) of the Milk Act which bars the operation of an unlicensed "milk plant." At the time the Crown charged Schmidt, he operated a 150-member herdshare with 24 cows on 100 acres at Glencolton Farms near Durham, Ontario. Members paid $300 for a single share of 1/4 of a cow. Schmidt was acquitted at his 2009 trial. The Crown appealed Schmidt's acquittal and in 2011 the Ontario Court of Justice overturned Schmidt's acquittal. The Court fined Schmidt $5,000 and ordered him to pay $50,000 in court costs.

The Ontario court found that the herdshare arrangement did not include a formal contract of purchase or sale and that legal title to the cows remained with Schmidt. It equated membership in the herdshare to membership in a "big box" store "that requires a fee to be paid in order to gain access to the products located therein."

Schmidt appealed his conviction. A trial was set for February 5, 2014 at the Ontario Court of Appeals.

== Outbreaks in raw milk from herdshares in the United States ==
A herdshare agreement does not guarantee the safety of raw milk. Raw milk, like any other food product, is susceptible to contamination by foodborne pathogens which may result in illness. However, advocates maintain that a herdshare arrangement may offer the shareholder certain assurances relating to the care of the herd and handling of the milk that may result in a safer product that may otherwise be unavailable to consumers of retail raw milk purchased from either a grocery store, a farmers market or directly from the farmer at the farm or elsewhere.

In 2013, three of the eight bacteriological outbreaks in raw milk occurred in individuals who consumed milk produced on farms operating herdshares.

Month	State	Etiology	No. Infected	No. Hospitalized	Deaths	Notes
Oct.	Tennessee	E.coil 0157	9	3	0	200 shareholders
May	Alaska	Campylobacter	5	0	0	Less than 10 cows; same dairy as below
Feb.	Alaska	Campylobacter	31	0	0	
