= 2022 United States infant formula shortage =

Shortage of infant formula in the United States

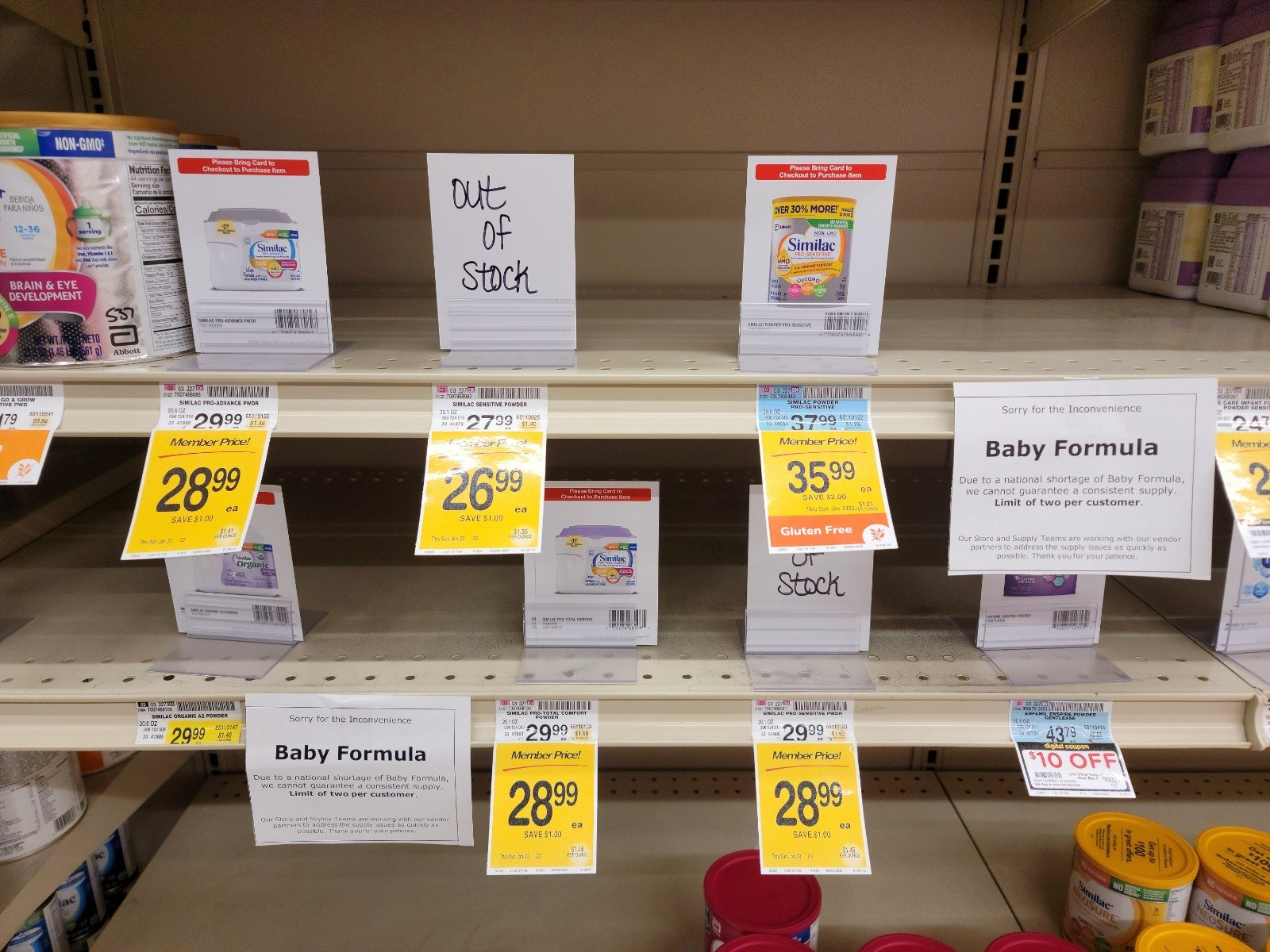
Bare formula shelves with purchase limit notice, at a Safeway store in Monroe, Washington, in January 2022

In 2022, the United States experienced a severe shortage of infant formula as a result of the 2021–2022 global supply chain crisis compounded by a large scale product recall after two babies died after consuming Abbott infant formula, import restrictions, and market concentration. Unlike other food products, infant formula often does not have an available and acceptable substitute as a source of nutrition for those who rely on it. In addition to infants, the formula recalls affected non-infant medical patients who require nasogastric feeding or have certain other conditions.

On May 14, nationwide out-of-stock rates were reported to be 43%, up from 31% two weeks prior; by May 22, they had surged to 70%, where they remained through the start of July. This is drastically above normal out-of-stock rates of 10%, or reported in the first half of 2021, 2% to 8%. In many places, store shelves were bare. Delaware, Kansas, and Tennessee were reported to be the hardest-hit states. On May 27, FDA Commissioner Robert Califf reported to the Senate Health Committee that shortages would continue into July. Effects of the shortage were also felt in Canada.

== Causes ==
=== Supply chain issues ===
The initial cause of the formula shortage was COVID-19-related supply chain issues, with some sources, including The Atlantic and Popular Mechanics, identifying these as still being (as of mid-May 2022) the leading cause. The shortage began in the early days of the pandemic, and worsened with subsequent labor shortages. By November 2021, 11% of popular brands were out of stock.

=== Recall and plant shutdown ===
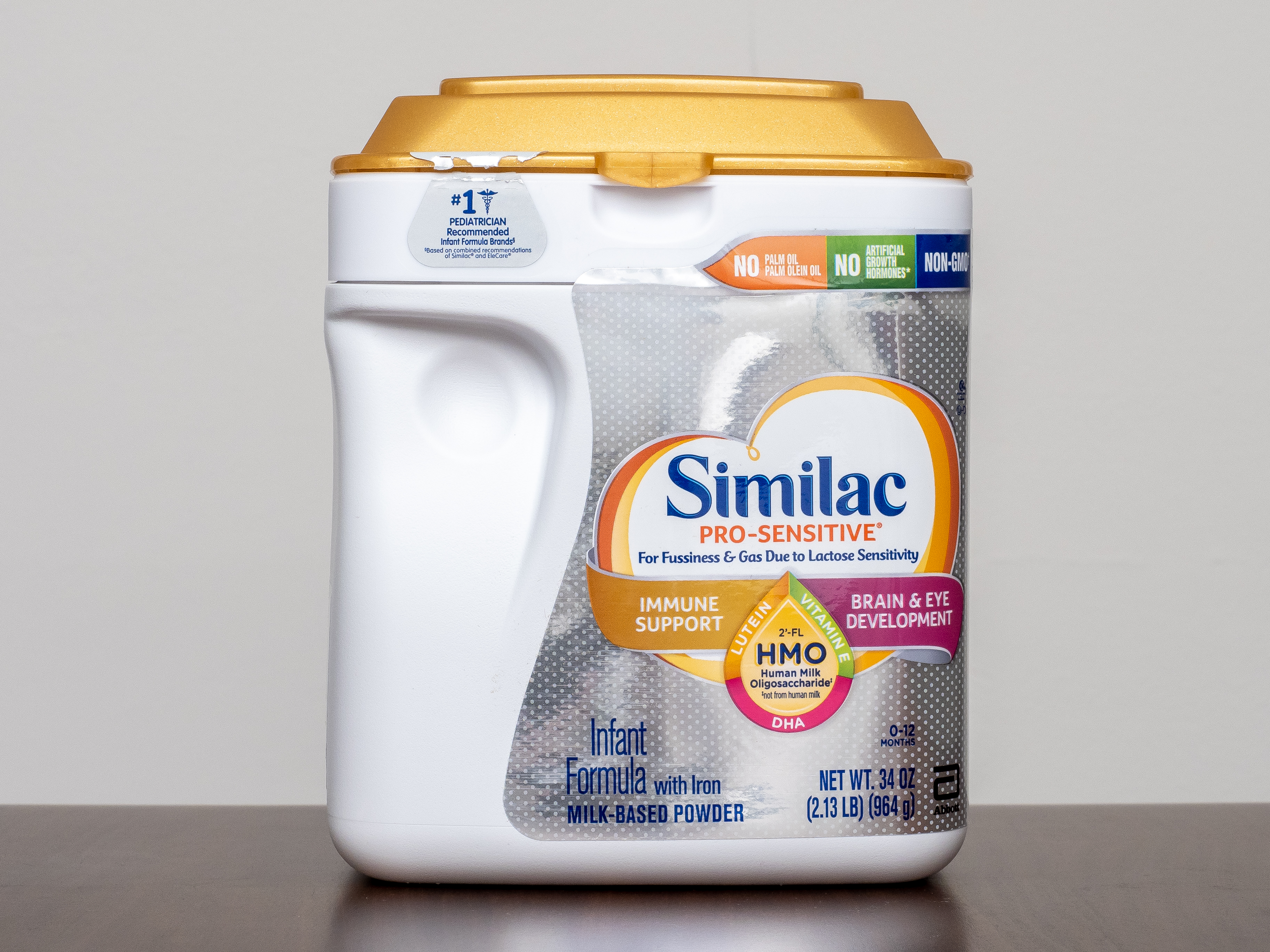
Similac baby formula

The problem was exacerbated when Abbott Labs, one of three major formula producers in the United States, shut down production at its Sturgis, Michigan plant in February 2022, following a Food and Drug Administration recall of several brands of formula due to possible bacterial contamination that may have caused at least two infant deaths. Abbott produces 40% of the formula sold in the US, mostly under the Similac brand, and the Sturgis facility is its largest. The bacterium which sickened the infants, Cronobacter sakazakii, was found at the Sturgis plant. The CDC performed whole genome sequencing on Cronobacter bacteria from two patient samples, and found that the samples were not closely related to strains collected in the Sturgis plant, or to each other. In a press release, Abbott cited the CDC report and stated, "there is no evidence to link our formulas to these infant illnesses". FDA officials disputed this claim, citing the shortage of genetic data on C. sakazakii in the CDC database, making identification and comparison of strains difficult, and the high likelihood of missed detection of all strains at the plant using the procedures currently in place. The CEO of Abbott apologized for the voluntary recall on May 22, stating that their voluntary recall had exacerbated the infant formula shortage in the US, while also stating that the voluntary recall was the "right thing to do."

On June 10, the FDA stated that it was investigating reports that nine children died after consuming infant formula produced in the Sturgis plant, seven more than were previously acknowledged by the agency. In all nine reported fatalities, the agency was unable to identify the source of the infection. Abbott Nutrition maintained that no causal relationship had been established between its products and any of the reported infant deaths. The report was brought to the light by a FOIA request by eFoodAlert, a website for food safety information.

==== Alleged problems at Sturgis plant ====
In October 2021, four months before the recall, a former employee of Abbott Nutrition in its Sturgis plant raised concerns about safety violations in the plant to senior FDA officials. The whistleblower outlined allegations of lax cleaning practices, improper training of employees, falsified records, and efforts by officials at the plant in 2019 to keep FDA inspectors from learning about serious issues related to the plant's system for checking for bacterial contaminants in the formula. The report alleged that some of the equipment in the Sturgis plant was "failing and in need of repair", as some product flow pipes were pitting and had pinholes, and that Abbott management had been aware of the issues seven years ahead of the outbreak. The allegations were sent to senior food safety officials in the FDA. The FDA did not inspect the plant until January 31, 2022.

=== Import restrictions ===
A trade analyst for the libertarian Cato Institute noted that infant formula is subjected to high tariffs as well as tariff-rate quotas (TRQs). An item subject to TRQs has some imports subject to a tariff, and over-quota excess subject to a tariff and additional duties, making it expensive to import. A provision of the 2020 United States–Mexico–Canada Agreement imposed new restrictions on imports of formula from Canada; the United States imported no baby formula from Canada in 2021. The FDA also prohibits the import (for commercial purposes) and sale of formula from Europe in the US, even though many European formulas meet or exceed FDA nutritional guidelines, because their nutritional labeling does not conform to US requirements.

=== Market concentration ===
Ninety percent of the formula in the United States is made by just four companies, including Abbott Nutrition. Abbott manufactures 43% of the US infant formula. Transportation Secretary Pete Buttigieg alleged that the industry's "enormous market concentration" may have exacerbated the problem. Senator Tammy Duckworth (D-IL) also urged the FTC to study whether market consolidation in the infant formula industry caused the shortage. According to Claire Kelloway of the Open Markets Institute, manufacturers operate a relatively small number of formula factories to increase efficiency and to reduce cost. But this creates lots of risk if a plant is closed, as happened with the Sturgis plant. FDA Commissioner Robert Califf acknowledged that the market concentration in the industry deserves more scrutiny. David Davis, a professor of economics at the South Dakota State University, has alleged that WIC (Special Supplemental Nutrition Program for Women, Infants, and Children) contracts help create monopolies that make it hard for other brands to break into the market. Davis stated that without WIC contracts, no player will be able to enter the industry. Davis stated that this kind of market concentration gives little flexibility if things go wrong, as one single plant will have a big impact on the industry.

== Effects ==
At the start of May, with shortages nationwide, the worst-hit states were Tennessee, Texas, Iowa, North Dakota, and South Dakota, all with out-of-stock rates at or greater than 50%. A further twenty-five states and Washington, DC, had out-of-stock rates between 40% and 50%, according to the market analysis firm Datasembly. As of May 16, San Antonio, Texas, was the most affected place, with out-of-stock rates reaching 57%. Shortages were reportedly particularly acute in rural areas. Black and Hispanic parents were particularly affected; these groups typically receive less support for lactation, and were historically marketed to at higher rates by formula manufacturers, resulting in lower rates of breastfeeding. In addition, Black and Hispanic families are more likely to be reliant on WIC programs that limit formula purchasing options, and to live in areas where shortages were particularly acute.

=== Sale and donation of breast milk ===
Milk banks reported a surge in demand for breast milk and breast milk donations in response to the shortage. Milk banks in the US and Canada are overseen by the Human Milk Banking Association of North America, which certifies that banks employ donor screening, blood testing, and testing of donated milk to ensure dangerous drugs and communicable diseases are not transmitted, and pasteurize milk to prevent contamination. However, milk from milk banks is typically reserved for premature infants and those with certain high-risk health conditions. Where it can be purchased for healthy, full-term infants, it is often expensive, as high as $4 to $5 per ounce.

The informal sale or exchange of breastmilk in the US is both legal and unregulated. Some outlets such as Craigslist and eBay do not allow the sale of breastmilk. Informal sharing of breastmilk carries risks for contamination, disease transmission, and exposure to harmful drugs and medications, and is discouraged by the American Academy of Pediatrics and the FDA. A 2018 survey found that twelve percent of surveyed mothers had donated milk informally, and seven percent had given their babies donated milk. Outcomes of babies given informally donated milk are not well researched. The Academy of Breastfeeding Medicine encourages parents who are considering using informally donated milk to talk to their pediatrician first; to interview potential donors about the use of medications or herbs, recreational drug use, and disease status; and to pasteurize donated milk whenever possible.

=== Use of alternative foods ===
Some parents watered down the formula to stretch their supply. Doctors warn that this practice can upset the sodium balance in infants' bodies and cause dangerous brain swelling and seizures. Doctors also warned that this practice can also result in too much potassium being retained, which could increase the risk of cardiac conductive abnormalities.

Other parents introduced cow's milk, almond or soy milk, juice, or solids before their children are developmentally ready. Doctors warned that giving cow's milk to babies under one year old is unhealthy, as cow's milk does not have enough iron to support brain development, and the heavier solute load in cow's milk makes the kidneys work harder. Feeding cow's milk to infants under a year old can also trigger allergies and intestinal bleeding. Doctors stated that, under extreme circumstances, babies older than six months can be given whole cow's milk for a few days.

Google searches for homemade formula recipes increased by 2400%, and a formula recipe from the 1950s circulated online, as doctors warned of the dangers of trying to make formula at home, including possibilities for dangerous contamination, and nutrient and electrolyte imbalances which may lead to severe malnutrition and death.

=== Hospitalizations ===
Children in several states were hospitalized as a result of the shortage. In Tennessee, two children requiring an amino-acid-based formula due to short bowel syndrome were hospitalized. They had been eating EleCare, an Abbott product manufactured in the shut-down Sturgis plant. In South Carolina, four infants were hospitalized, three due to poor reactions to new formulas and one due to mineral imbalances in a homemade formula. A hospital in Atlanta also reported treating infants affected by the shortage.

=== Bot usage ===
There were reports of people using Internet bots to continuously search the web for formulas available for online purchase. Some people used bots to resell the scarce product at a steep markup, while others set them up as a free service for parents struggling to find available products.

=== Shortage in Canada ===
On May 21, Health Canada announced a shortage alert on formulas for babies that are at risk of severe allergic reactions. Health Canada stated that the shortage was related to the closing of the Abbott plant in Sturgis. The closed Sturgis plant had shipped hypoallergenic formula to Canada.

== Responses ==
=== Efforts to prevent price gouging ===
On May 12, the White House called on the Federal Trade Commission and state attorneys to crack down on price gouging and other unfair market practices affecting the sale of infant formula.

Many retailers, including CVS, Walgreens, and Target, and some states, implemented limits on the number of containers of formula that could be purchased at one time, to mitigate panic buying. Instances of online price gouging on resold formula were reported. Fox News reported that independent sellers were selling infant formula at double or triple the normal price. Some states, including Georgia, California, Colorado, New Jersey, and Oregon, and cities including New York City, invoked emergency measures to prevent retailers from price gouging.

=== Efforts to increase supply ===
On May 11, House Republicans introduced a bill directing the FDA to review Codex Alimentarius, an internationally adopted food standard for baby formula, to ensure that international standards are consistent with US standards to guide the importation of formula.

On May 12, the White House announced it was taking several regulatory steps to mitigate the effects of the shortage, particularly for lower-income parents. The Federal Trade Commission was directed to investigate cases of profiteering. States were urged to expand the formula products available for purchase with WIC benefits, which place limits on the brands, types, and sizes that may be purchased. About half of the infant formula consumed in the US is purchased with WIC. Federal agencies were tasked with finding ways to increase imports of formula, which typically account for 2% of US consumption. The White House also stated that the FDA would soon announce steps to accelerate imports from Mexico, Chile, Ireland and the Netherlands.

On May 13, President Biden announced he was considering invoking the Defense Production Act to increase production of formula. The USDA also announced that they were working with states to relax rules on what products families can purchase with WIC benefits, though not all states adopted all flexibilities.

On May 17, House Appropriations Committee Chairwoman Rosa DeLauro (D-CT) introduced a bill called The Infant Formula Supplemental Appropriations Act, aiming to provide $28 million in emergency funding to the FDA, to prevent further shortages, to boost inspections of domestic and international suppliers, and to prevent fraudulent products entering the US domestic market. Reckitt Benckiser, which makes Enfamil and has factories in the United States, increased their production by 30%. Nestlé announced plans to fly baby formula from Switzerland and Netherlands to alleviate the shortage in the United States. Nestlé would specifically import a hypoallergenic formula, Gerber Good Start Extensive HA, from the Netherlands, and Alfamino from Switzerland. Both formulas can be used to feed babies who are allergic to cow's milk protein.

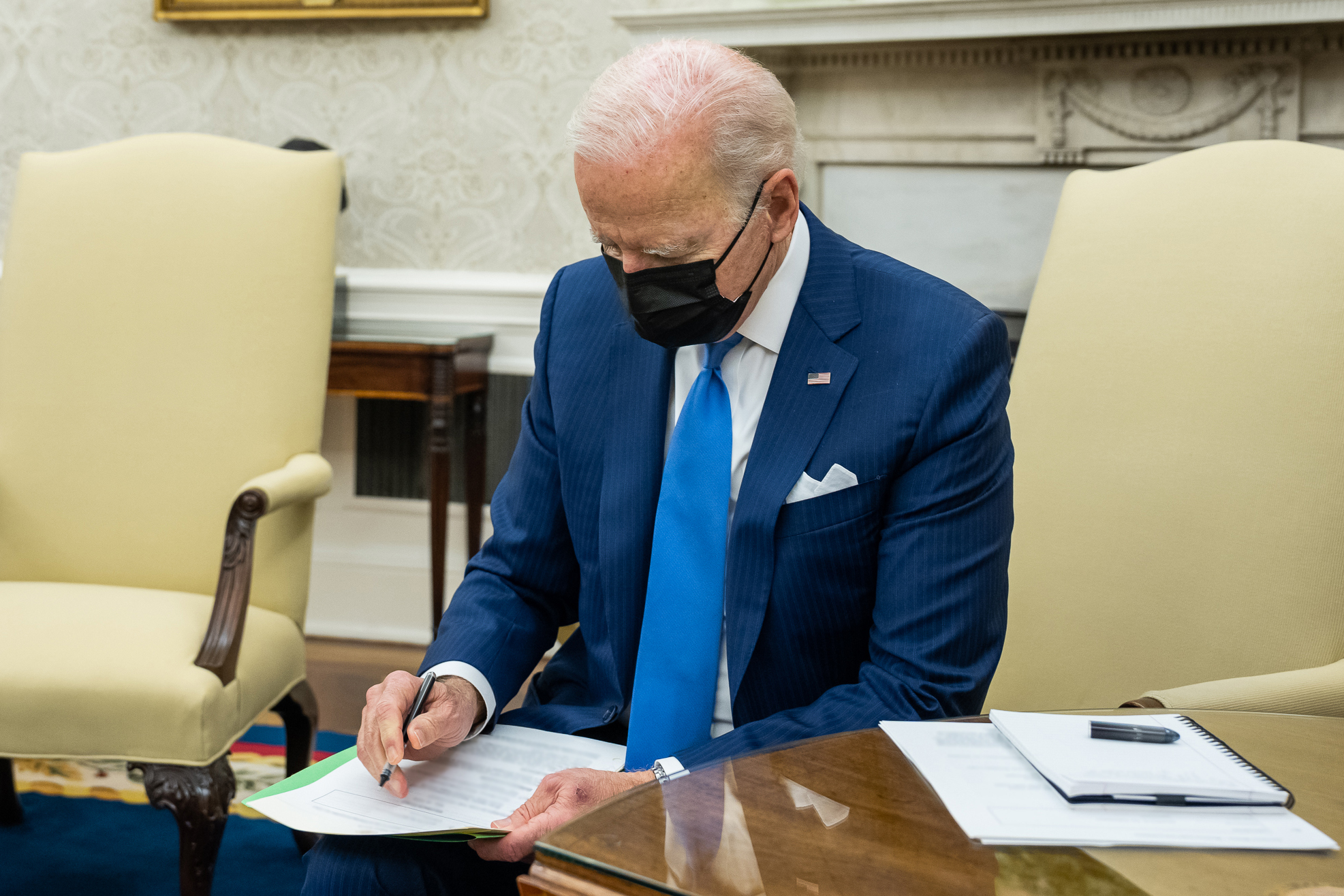
President Joe Biden invokes the Defense Production Act and launches Operation Fly Formula

On May 18, after a bipartisan push by House members, President Biden announced that he would invoke the Defense Production Act to speed up domestic manufacturing of infant formula. Biden also launched "Operation Fly Formula" to fly in infant formula from overseas. Biden directed the Department of Health and Human Services and the Department of Agriculture to use Department of Defense commercial aircraft to pick up overseas infant formula that meets American health and safety standards. The White House stated that the DoD would use its contracts with commercial air cargo lines to fly in the infant formula.

On the same day, the House of Representatives passed two bills addressing the infant formula shortage. The House voted 414-9 to pass H.R. 7791, a measure that would allow low-income women to purchase more infant formula through the WIC program, by giving the Department of Agriculture more flexibility during product recall and other crisis, removing restrictions on what brand of infant formula can be purchased using WIC. Typically, WIC vouchers can only be used to purchase one state-determined brand of infant formula, which encourages formula manufacturers to offer states large discount to secure a state's business. The House also passed H.R. 7790, called the Infant Formula Supplemental Appropriations Act of 2022, a bill that provides $28 million in emergency funding to the FDA to address FDA-regulated infant formula, prevent future shortages, and prevent fraudulent products from entering the US market. House Minority Whip Steve Scalise (R-LA) urged Republicans to vote no on H.R. 7790, claiming that the legislation was proposed "in hopes of covering up the administration's ineptitude by throwing additional money at the FDA with no plan to actually fix the problem, all while failing to hold the FDA accountable." H.R. 7790 was passed with a partisan vote of 232-192, with twelve Republicans voting to pass the bill.

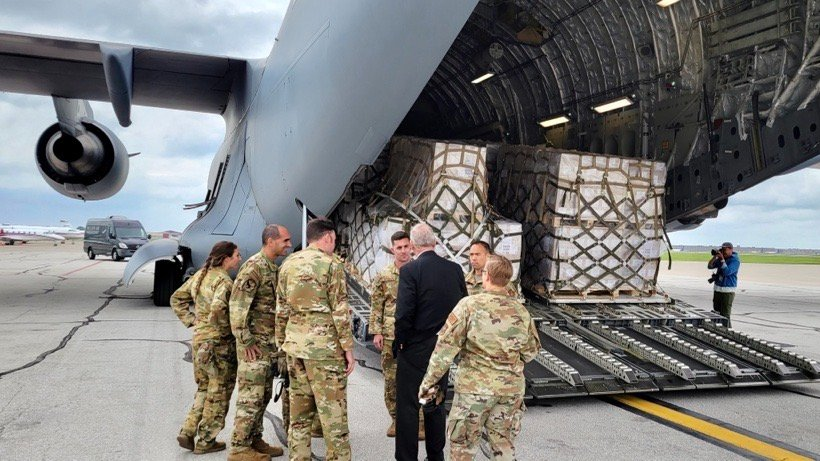
Agriculture Secretary Tom Vilsack meets the first shipment of baby formula transported from Europe by the military in Operation Fly Formula to Indianapolis, Indiana, on May 22, 2022.

On May 22, the first flight of Operation Fly Formula arrived in the United States. 78,000 pounds (35,000 kg) of formula, including 1.5 million 8-ounce bottles, were transported using military planes from Ramstein Air Base in Germany to Indianapolis. Indianapolis was chosen because it is a Nestlé distribution hub. The shipment accounted for 15% of the domestic need for specialty medical grade infant formula.

On June 15, Abbott announced that it would import 686,350 cans of infant formula from its plant in Granada, Spain, starting in June.

On July 7, the Biden administration announced plans to maintain, through at least November, the relaxation of policy that has allowed foreign manufacturers to sell their products in the US, in order to ensure market diversity.

=== Efforts to restore production ===
On May 11, 2022, Abbott stated that it hoped to resume production at Sturgis in two weeks.

On May 16, the FDA and Abbott Laboratories agreed on a consent decree on the steps needed to reopen the plant and restore production. The FDA expected Abbott to restore production in its Sturgis plant in two weeks. Under the decree, Abbott agreed to correct the unsanitary conditions that led to the bacterial contamination and plant closure. On May 17, the agreement was approved by a federal judge. The agreement will be valid for five years; if Abbott fails to comply with the agreement, the company will be subject to a fine of $30,000 for each day of violation, up to a maximum penalty of $5 million annually.

Abbott expected that it would take six to eight weeks after the restart of production in its Sturgis plant for the product to reach consumers. Abbott stated that it had implemented new technologies in its manufacturing process, including an augmented reality system to aid the company in making manufacturing decisions. The company also stated that it has upgraded its environmental monitoring program and auto sampling technology, and is allowing its electronic records of batches to be accessed in real-time by its testing and monitoring teams. Abbott stated that its product testing "already meets or exceeds regulatory requirements."

On June 4, production at the Sturgis plant restarted under the conditions laid out in the consent decree. Abbott estimated that it would take six to eight weeks before the facility would be back to full capacity.

On June 16, production at the Sturgis plant stopped again after severe storms in southwestern Michigan flooded areas in the plant, further delaying formula production for a few weeks.

=== Investigations ===
==== Congressional investigation ====
US Congressional Representatives Carolyn Maloney (D-NY) and Raja Krishnamoorthi (D-IL) contacted the four leading formula manufacturers in the US, which together control 90% of the market, to inquire into the causes of and responses to the shortage, and to urge those companies to do whatever they can to increase their production. On May 12, House Energy and Commerce Committee Chair Frank Pallone (D-NJ) announced that a hearing with the FDA would be held on May 25, to "try to determine what they can do better."

On May 17, House Speaker Nancy Pelosi warned that the shortage crisis could result in indictments, though she did not specify who might be indicted, and for what.

==== FDA investigation ====
On May 17, the FDA announced that it would investigate the delay in dispatching investigators to the Sturgis plant in Michigan.

In July, the FDA commissioned an outside review of its food and tobacco programs to be led by the Reagan-Udall Foundation, with initial findings to be reported in sixty days.

==== ABC News investigation ====
An investigation by ABC News of FDA inspection reports dating back five years found that in that time, three other major formula manufacturers – Mead Johnson (owned by Reckitt), Gerber, and PBM Holdings (owned by Perrigo) – were cited for operational issues similar to those reported at the Abbott plant, and in some cases were found to have instances of Cronobacter contamination. Cronobacter is a common environmental bacterium in soil, but can be very dangerous to infants.

==== DOJ investigation ====
In January 2023, the United States Department of Justice opened a criminal investigation into the events leading to the Sturgis plant closure.

== Commentary ==
=== Breast milk vs. formula debate ===
Some commentators, including actress Bette Midler, suggested breast milk as a "free" solution to the shortage, touting its documented health benefits, and in some cases stigmatizing formula use. In response, others stated reasons that breast milk is not a viable option for many parents, including the inability to lactate (e.g. with adopted or foster children), underproduction (particularly if lactation is not started and continued from birth), expression of potentially harmful pharmaceuticals in breastmilk, various medical conditions in infants that result in intolerance to breastmilk, and the logistical difficulties of breastfeeding and pumping for parents who work outside the home. Breastfeeding newborns typically takes about thirty minutes, eight to twelve times a day. Rebekah Diamond, an assistant professor of pediatrics at Columbia University, wrote that "many, if not most, infants will need at least some amount of formula supplementation to reach their optimal health", and "a variety of infections, medications and genetic conditions can take breastfeeding off the table entirely".

=== Criticism of federal response ===
Republicans claimed that President Biden and the FDA were slow to respond to the shortage and stingy with information.

On May 13, a group of GOP members criticized the Biden administration for the shortage of baby formula, blaming the White House for not moving fast enough to restock formula, as part of larger criticisms of supply chain problems and inflation. Republican Senator Mitt Romney also wrote to the FDA, expressing his concern that the agency was not working quickly enough to investigate the contamination of the formula and to work to get more options onto the market. Minority Whip Steve Scalise stated that addressing the infant formula shortage should supersede the Senate's push to codify the Roe v. Wade decision that ensured the legality of abortion nationwide.

Tinglong Dai, a professor at the Johns Hopkins University's Carey Business School stated in an interview with The New York Times that the Biden administration had ignored a crisis that was coming, as the administration had three months to resolve the potential crisis, but did not do much to resolve the crisis. Dai also stated that recent actions by Biden would help, but the effect would be limited as they did not address production schedule and labor shortage issues.

On May 19, during a budget hearing over the FDA's handling of the infant formula crisis, Representative Rosa DeLauro (D-CT) characterized the FDA's response to the incident as "sluggish", as it took four months to pull the product from the shelf. DeLauro asked Dr. Robert Califf, the head of the FDA, whether the FDA should have "[sprang] into action" sooner. The New York Times also reported that administration officials were struggling to explain how the use of Defense Production Act would alleviate the crisis.

A report by Politico on June 9 reported that White House officials initially thought the crisis was under control when the Sturgis plant was closed, and the recall was issued in February. Biden officials acknowledge that they did not have complete data on retail stock rates for infant formula. A rush by companies to push all their reserve stocks into the market may also have distorted the data, creating a false sense of security. The White House’s Domestic Policy Council and National Economic Council, which had been monitoring general supply chain concerns regarding formula, concluded that the recall by Abbott Nutrition did not warrant involvement by President Biden and his top staff, as President Biden was preoccupied with the invasion of Ukraine by Russia. The infant formula shortage was only acknowledged by Biden and his top staff in May after images of empty storage shelves began appearing on social media. The White House maintained that it had taken immediate action in April when the data showed that infant formula supplies had dropped across the country.

==== White House response ====
President Biden rejected the idea that his administration moved too slowly, stating that it moved "as quickly as a problem becomes apparent to us". Biden said that he was moving with speed and caution, as the product needs to be a "first-rate product".

White House press secretary Jen Psaki said that providing migrants with baby formula was in line with the Flores Settlement Agreement of 1993 that every administration has followed since its enactment and that "We also think it's morally the right thing to do".

==== Formula availability at the Southern border ====
An unverified photo tweeted by Republican representative Kat Cammack shows shelves containing formula, which she asserted came from the Ursula migrant processing center. She also stated that the border agent who sent her the photo told her that the center was receiving "pallets" of formula. House Republican Conference Chairwoman Elise Stefanik (R-NY) also alleged that Joe Biden was sending pallets of baby formula to the Southern border; Stefanik's statement prompted criticism from Democratic politicians. Senator Marsha Blackburn (R-TN) also claimed that a border patrol agent informed her that the Southern border facilities had a surplus of infant formula, and she suggested that the surplus should be sent to Texas and Tennessee. Criticizing Blackburn's plan, Dr. Steven Schooner, a professor of government procurement law at George Washington University, said he was "extremely confident that any volume of formula that the Homeland Security Department and Customs and Border Protection buys is statistically the equivalent of zero in terms of market share."

Some politicians from the Republican Party alleged the Biden administration was prioritizing the needs of migrant children over those of American citizens by providing formula to children at the Southern border. Texas Governor Greg Abbott and the president of the border patrol union jointly characterized providing a formula to migrants as "another one in a long line of reckless, out-of-touch priorities from the Biden administration." Cammack appeared on the program of Fox News host Sean Hannity, who showed other photos he described as "pallets and pallets of baby formula for illegal immigrants and their families even as hardworking American families, we are now suffering a massive nationwide shortage." The Hannity photos showed boxes of powdered milk, which is intended by its manufacturer to be consumed by infants more than one year old.

Conservative news outlets and pundits amplified Republican criticisms, including some who asserted the Cammack photo showed Biden was shipping "thousands" of pallets of baby formula to migrants. The Washington Post fact-checker characterized blaming Biden administration migrant policies for the formula shortage as "a ridiculous faux outrage."

== See also ==
- 2008 Chinese milk scandal
- 2013 Fonterra recall
- 2022–2023 food crises
- Food safety in the United States
- Infant food safety
- Swill milk scandal
