= Infant food safety =

Foodborne illness (also foodborne disease and colloquially referred to as food poisoning) is any illness resulting from the food spoilage of contaminated food, pathogenic bacteria, viruses, or parasites that contaminate food. Infant food safety is the identification of risky food handling practices and the prevention of illness in infants. Foodborne illness is a serious health issue, especially for babies and children. Infants and young children are particularly vulnerable to foodborne illness because their immune systems are not developed enough to fight off foodborne bacterial infections. 800,000 illnesses affect children under the age of 10 in the U.S. each year. Therefore, extra care should be taken when handling and preparing their food.

== Prevention ==
Handwashing is the first step in maintaining the safety of infant food. Caregivers' hands can pick up bacteria and spread bacteria to the baby. Situations in which one can encounter high levels of bacteria are:

- Diapers containing feces and urine
- Raw meat and raw poultry
- Uncooked seafood, and eggs
- Dogs and cats, turtles, snakes, birds, and lizards, among other animals.
- Soil
- Other children

Handwashing can remove harmful bacteria and will help prevent foodborne illness. Instructing other children in a family on good handwashing will help to limit the spread of bacteria that cause illness.

Handwashing is most effective in providing safe food for the infant during 'key times':

- Before preparing and feeding bottles or foods to the baby.
- Before touching the baby's mouth.
- Before touching pacifiers or other things that go into the baby's mouth.
- After using the toilet or changing diapers.

== Infant formula ==
Though breastfeeding helps prevent many kinds of sicknesses among infants, caregivers often choose to use infant formula. Promoting food safety in infants requires safe preparation and use.

Infant formula should be used within two hours of preparation. If the infant does not finish the entire bottle, the remainder is thrown away. If the prepared feed is not used right away, refrigerating it immediately will slow the growth of microorganisms; however, it must be used within 24 hours.

Cronobacter, formerly known as Enterobacter sakazakii, is a group of bacteria that can be found in the environment. The germs can also live in dry foods, such as powdered infant formula. Anybody can get sick from Cronobacter, but the infection occurs most often in infants. Cronobacter infections are rare, but they can be deadly in newborns. Infections in infants usually occur in the first days or weeks of life. Cronobacter germs can cause dangerous blood infections (sepsis) or infections of the linings surrounding the brain and spine (meningitis). Infants up to two months of age are the most likely to develop meningitis if they get sick with Cronobacter. Infants born prematurely and infants with a lower ability to fight germs and sickness due to illness (such as HIV) or medical treatment (such as chemotherapy for cancer) are also more likely to get sick. The first symptom of Cronobacter infection in infants is usually a fever, coupled with poor feeding, crying, or very low energy. Parents or caregivers should take an infant with these symptoms to see a doctor.

=== Infection prevention ===
Cronobacter infections can be prevented by:

- Breastfeeding. This is one of the best things that can be done for the infant's health, and benefits include preventing many kinds of infections. Reported Cronobacter infections among infants who were fed only breast milk and no formula or other foods are rare.
- Cleaning, sanitizing, and storing dry feeding items and breast pump parts. Contamination can be prevented and the milk kept relatively free of microbes by washing, sanitizing, and safely storing other feeding implements.
- Cleaning the breasts before nursing.
- Keeping ill family and friends from feeding the infant.
- Using liquid formula, when possible.
- Choosing infant formula sold in liquid form over powdered, especially in very young infants.
- Preparing powdered infant formula safely.

=== Safe infant formula preparation ===
Recommendations from health organizations for the preparation of infant formula are:

- Warming treated and clean water to at least 158 °F /70 °C and pour it into the bottle.
- Adding infant formula and carefully shaking, rather than stirring the bottle.
- Cooling the mixture so that it is not too hot before feeding the baby by running the prepared, capped bottle under treated, clean, and cool water, taking care to keep the cooling water from getting into the bottle or on the nipple.
- Testing the temperature of the mixture by shaking a few drops on the wrist.

If soap and water are not available, an alcohol-based hand sanitizer with at least 60% alcohol should be used. Hand sanitizer with at least 60% alcohol is effective in killing Cronobacter germs. But using soap and water as soon as possible afterwards is imperative because hand sanitizer does not kill all types of germs and may not work as well if hands are visibly greasy or dirty.

Cronobacter can also cause diarrhea and urinary tract infections in people of all ages. The infection can be serious for older people and for people whose immune systems are weakened by other illnesses or conditions. They are also more likely to get sick.

Caregivers can prepare infant formula safely by:

- Preparing safe water for mixing: Bring tap water to a rolling boil and boil it for one minute. Bottled water can be sterilized before using.
- Using clean bottles and nipples: Sterilizing bottles and nipples before first use is safer. After that, it is safe to wash them by hand or in a dishwasher.
- Not making more formula than is needed. The formula can become contaminated during preparation, and bacteria can multiply quickly if the formula is improperly stored. The safest practice is to make formula in smaller quantities on an as-needed basis to greatly reduce the possibility of contamination and always follow the label instructions for mixing formula.

=== Heating breast milk or infant formula ===
There are two ways to heat bottles: with disposable inserts or hard plastic, and glass bottles. A bottle can be placed under hot, running tap water until the desired temperature is reached. This should take 1-2 minutes. A bottle can be placed in a pan after the water has been heated on a stove. The pan can be removed from the heat and set the bottle in it until it is warm. It is safer to shake milk or formula to even out the temperature. Heating breast milk or infant formula in the microwave is not recommended. This results in "hot spots" that can scald a baby's mouth and throat.

== Cow's milk ==
Cow's milk by itself is not appropriate for infants less than one year old. Cow's milk does not have the correct balance of nutrients for infants to grow and develop normally, and it can cause problems with anemia and kidney function. Raw milk is never appropriate for infants or anyone else. It should not be consumed by anyone at any time for any purpose. Raw milk often harbors dangerous microorganisms, such as Salmonella, E. coli, and Listeria, that can pose serious health risks. Most infant formula is made with cow's milk, but it has been modified and supplemented with additional nutrients. As a result, the formula is more nutritious and easier for the baby to digest than cow's milk. Other formula options include soy-based formulas and hypoallergenic (or protein hydrolysate and amino acid-based) formulas. Special formulas are available for babies who are premature or have other health problems.

== Sanitizing objects ==
Infants put anything within reach into their mouths. It is also important to keep all objects that enter the baby's mouth (such as pacifiers and teethers) clean. Though research into five-second rule has been done, results are inconclusive.

== Solid foods ==
Infants are introduced to solid foods at different ages. Breast milk alone is sufficient to support optimal growth and development for approximately the first six months after birth. For very young infants, water, juice, and other foods are generally unnecessary. Even when babies enjoy discovering new tastes and textures, solid foods should not replace breastfeeding, but merely complement breast milk as the infant's main source of nutrients throughout the first year. Beyond one year, as the variety and volume of solid foods gradually increase, breast milk remains an ideal addition to the child's diet. Parents and caregivers can reduce choking hazards in a child's environment. Special attention should be given to food and nonfood items (e.g., candy, nuts, and coins) commonly involved in choking. Younger children are particularly at risk because of their tendency to place objects in their mouths, poor chewing ability, and narrow airways compared with those of older children. Recommendations are available to guide parents and caregivers about the types of food items that are inappropriate for children aged less than four years. Removal of nonfood choking hazards is also important for infants and children aged less than five years because approximately one-third of all choking episodes involve nonfood items.

=== Microwaving of solid foods ===
When baby food is microwaved in a jar, it often heats unevenly. The hottest places are in the center of the food. The coolest places are next to the glass sides, which could lead you to believe that the food is not too hot. Safe practices for microwaving food for infants are:

- Don't microwave baby foods in the jar. Instead, transfer the food to a dish before microwaving it. This way, the food can be stirred and taste-tested for temperature.
- Microwave four ounces of solid food in a dish for about 15 seconds on high power. Always stir, let stand 30 seconds, and taste-test before feeding. Food that's "baby-ready" should taste or feel lukewarm.
- Do not heat baby food meats, meat sticks, or eggs in the microwave. Use the stovetop instead. These foods have a high fat content, and since microwaves heat fats faster than other substances, these foods can cause splattering and overheating.

=== First aid for choking ===
Early and effective treatment is crucial to prevent morbidity and mortality from childhood choking. Methods taught routinely in courses on cardiopulmonary resuscitation (CPR) or first aid can be lifesaving when instituted early by trained parents and caregivers. Opening the airway quickly by ejecting the foreign body can avoid potentially severe injuries. The American Academy of Pediatrics recommends that all parents and caregivers participate in the American Heart Association's Basic Lifesaving Course or the American Red Cross' Infant/Child CPR Course. To prevent infant choking, be sure your child has adequate motor skills to swallow food. Do not offer babies or young children high-risk foods, such as chunks of meat, cheese, grapes, or raw vegetables, unless they are cut up into small pieces. Avoid hard foods, such as nuts, seeds, and popcorn.

=== Commercial baby food ===
Infant food safety includes the evaluation of commercially prepared baby food before feeding it to a baby. Examining each jar of commercial baby food before using it and noting the position of the safety button on top of the jar will indicate whether or not the jar has been opened. Unopened baby food in jars will have a safety button that is down. A jar of baby food that is swelling, leaking, and contains chipped glass is probably not safe to feed to a baby. Some baby food comes in pouches. If the pouch is leaking or swelling, it may not be safe to feed it to a baby.

The Food and Drug Administration has published the following dos and don'ts regarding commercial baby food safety:

- Do not “double dip” with baby food.
- Never put baby food in the refrigerator if the baby does not finish it.
- It is best if a baby is not fed directly from the jar of baby food.
- A small serving of food on a clean dish and refrigerating the remaining food in the jar is safer.
- If the baby needs more food from the same jar, using a clean spoon to serve another portion is safer.
- It is safer to throw away any food in the dish that is not eaten.
- If a baby is fed from a jar, it is safer to throw away any food left in the jar.
- Sharing spoons is not the safest way to feed a baby
- Putting the baby's spoon in the mouth of another person is not safe.
- Baby food left out for two hours or more will begin to grow bacteria at room temperature. It is not safe.
- If an opened baby food container is stored in the refrigerator for more than three days, it may not be safe to feed the baby. "If in doubt, throw it out".

== Handwashing ==
1. Wet hands thoroughly with warm water and add soap.
2. Thoroughly scrub hands, wrists, fingernails, and in between fingers – for at least 20 seconds.
3. Rinse, then dry hands with a clean cloth towel or use a paper towel so the germs are thrown away.

=== When to wash ===
Handwashing prevents the spread of infection. Washing before and after handling food, after using the bathroom, changing diapers, or handling pets.

== Epidemiology ==
Caregivers of infants less than four months old:

- 41% didn't wash their hands after petting animals;
- 32% didn't wash their hands after changing the baby's diaper;
- 15% didn't wash their hands after using the bathroom;
- 10% didn't wash their hands after handling raw meat;
- 5% didn't wash their hands after gardening or working with soil.

== See also ==
- 2008 Chinese milk scandal
- 2022 United States infant formula shortage
- Daigou
- Food safety
