= Margaret Irving Handy =

American pediatrician (1889–1977)

- Born: 1889; Smyrna, Delaware
- Died: 1977 (aged 87–88)
- Education: Goucher College; Johns Hopkins School of Medicine
- Known for: Pioneer of pediatric medicine, established the first mothers' milk bank at Delaware Hospital
- Medical career
- Profession: Physician
- Institutions: Delaware Hospital
- Sub-specialties: Pediatrics

Margaret Irving Handy (1889–1977) was an American pioneering medical doctor who was one of the first to specialize in pediatric medicine. In 1945, she established the first mothers' milk bank at Delaware Hospital (now Wilmington Hospital) in Wilmington, Delaware.

She was born in Smyrna, Delaware, the daughter of L. Irving Handy, a U.S. Representative. She attended Goucher College and Johns Hopkins University School of Medicine from which she graduated in 1916. She was the first native-born female Delawarean to become a doctor and was also the state's first pediatrician.

In 1918, during an outbreak of Spanish influenza in the Wilmington area, Handy was asked by the Board of Health to open a paediatric ward at People's Settlement staffed by volunteers and with very little equipment. She subsequently established a pediatric clinic and became Assistant Chief, and in 1921, Chief, of Pediatrics at Delaware Hospital where she set up a nursery for premature babies.

Handy collected surplus breast milk in the community to feed the babies of mothers who could not breast feed, and in 1945 founded the Mother's Milk Bank with Margaret Trentman, a hospital board member whose baby son had died because she was unable to nurse him. The bank supplied breast milk to mothers throughout the United States as well as for research purposes, for 40 years.

She helped to establish ophthalmology as a speciality in Delaware, with Norman Cutler becoming the first state-certified ophthalmologist in 1947.

Handy received a number of awards including the New York Eye and Ear Infirmary's Elizabeth Blackwell Citation (honoring female doctors) and the Annie Jump Cannon medal from Wesley College as well as the 1953 Josiah Marvel Cup for outstanding contributions to the state and to society in the field of children's medicine.

The Margaret Handy Lectureship at Christiana Hospital in Newark, Delaware is named for her.

Andrew Wyeth painted The Children's Doctor, a "votive-like" portrait of Handy, in 1949 after she treated his son Nicholas at his remote farm. Wyeth painted another portrait, From the Capes, in 1974 and gave her Lenape Barn, a watercolour, as a gift in 1961.
