= Human Milk Banking Association of North America =

Milk bank accrediting organization of North America

- Abbreviation: HMBANA
- Type: Nonprofit
- Headquarters: Fort Worth, Texas
- Services: milk bank accreditation, standards development, lactation advocacy
- Executive Director: Lindsay B. Groff
- President: Summer Kelly
- Website: hmbana.org

The Human Milk Banking Association of North America (HMBANA) is a not-for-profit organization that accredits nonprofit milk banks in the United States and Canada, produces the standards and guidelines for donated breast milk in North America, and promotes lactation and breast feeding. The organization was founded in 1985. As of 2022, it has thirty-one member milk banks, including twenty-eight in the US and three in Canada. HMBANA is accredited by the US FDA, and is funded by membership dues and donations.

== Operations ==
HMBANA member banks provide donor milk to NICUs on a cost-recovery basis. In 2021, member banks distributed 9.2 million US fluid ounces (270,000 L) of breast milk, a 22% increase over the prior year. During the 2022 United States infant formula shortage, HMBANA saw a twenty percent increase in requests for donor milk, and increased donor applications.

HMBANA member banks screen potential donors for communicable diseases, medications, and illicit drug use. Donated milk is pooled to ensure consistency, pasteurized at 62.5 °C (144.5 °F) for 30 minutes, and tested for bacterial pathogens both before and after pasteurization. The milk is stored frozen until delivery. Donated milk is prioritized for "medically fragile" babies, and may be prescribed for preterm infants, or those with malabsorption, feeding intolerance, immune deficiency, or who have undergone gastrointestinal surgery. When donor milk is available for healthy infants, up to 40 US fluid ounces (1,200 mL) may be purchased without a prescription, at a typical cost of $3 to $5 an ounce. The American Academy of Pediatrics recommends against sharing breastmilk outside of accredited milk banks.

HMBANA-authored publications include 2018 Guidelines for the Establishment and Operation of a Donor Human Milk Bank; 2019 Fourth Edition of Best Practice for Expressing, Storing and Handling Human Milk in Hospitals, Homes, and Child Care Settings; and Lactation Support for the Bereaved Mother.

HMBANA is headquartered in Fort Worth, Texas, but is incorporated in Connecticut.
