= Raw milk =

Milk that has not been pasteurized

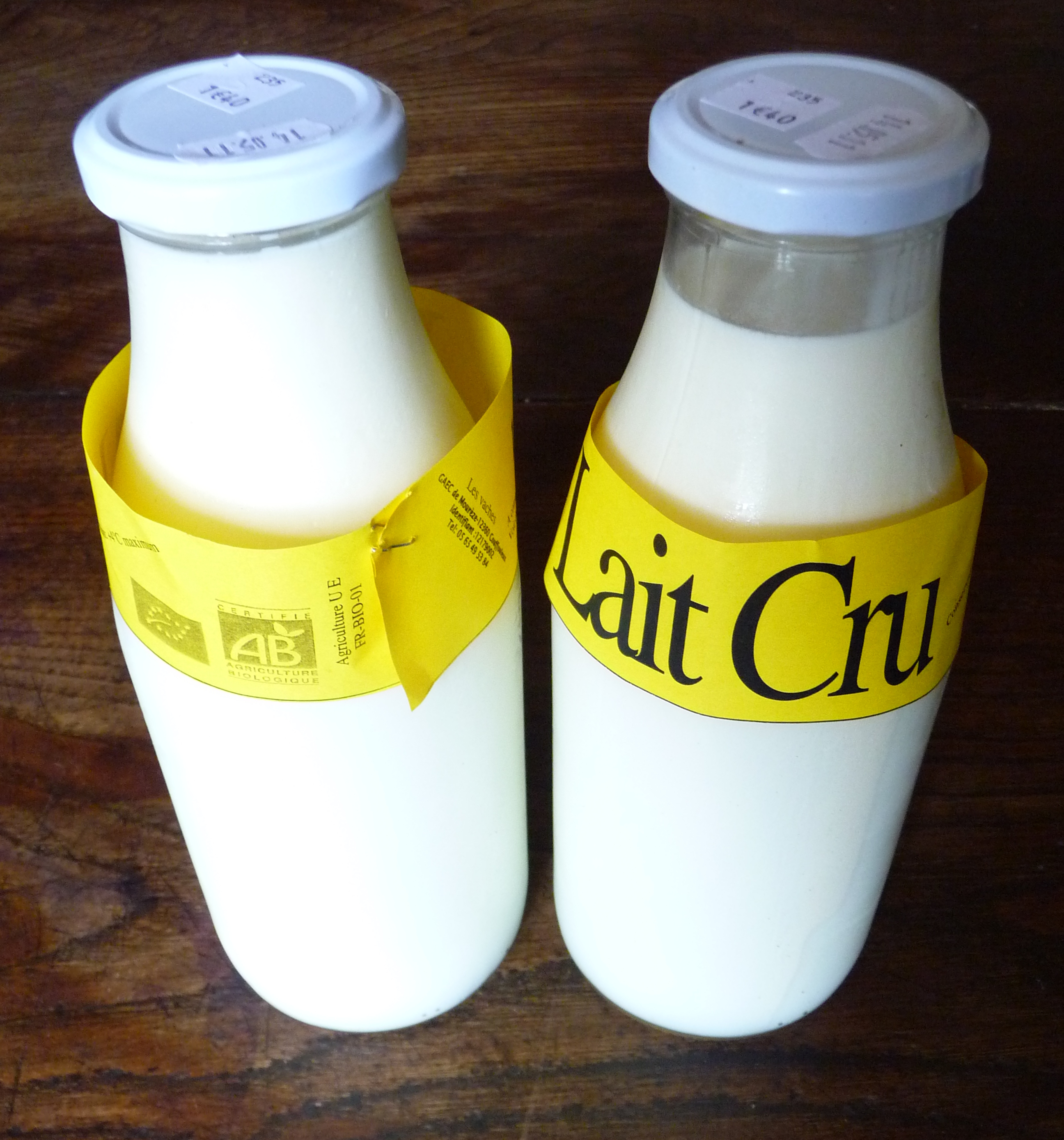
Raw milk from Aveyron, France

Raw milk or unpasteurized milk is milk that has not undergone pasteurization, a process of heating foods to kill pathogens for safe consumption and extension of shelf life.

Proponents have said that raw, unpasteurised milk has better flavor, and also provides better nutrition, contributions to the building of a healthy immune system and protection from allergies. However, no clear nutritional or health benefit of unpasteurised milk has been found, and there is consensus in the medical community that dangerous milk-borne diseases may be contracted from it and from products such as cheese made with it. Substantial evidence of this increased risk for no clear benefit has led countries around the world to either prohibit or regulate the sale of raw milk and raw milk products.

In countries where it is available for sale, its availability and regulations vary. In the European Union, individual member states can prohibit or restrict the sale of raw milk, but it is not banned throughout the EU; in some member states, the sale of raw milk through vending machines is permitted, though packaging typically instructs consumers to boil before consumption.

== History of raw milk and pasteurization ==
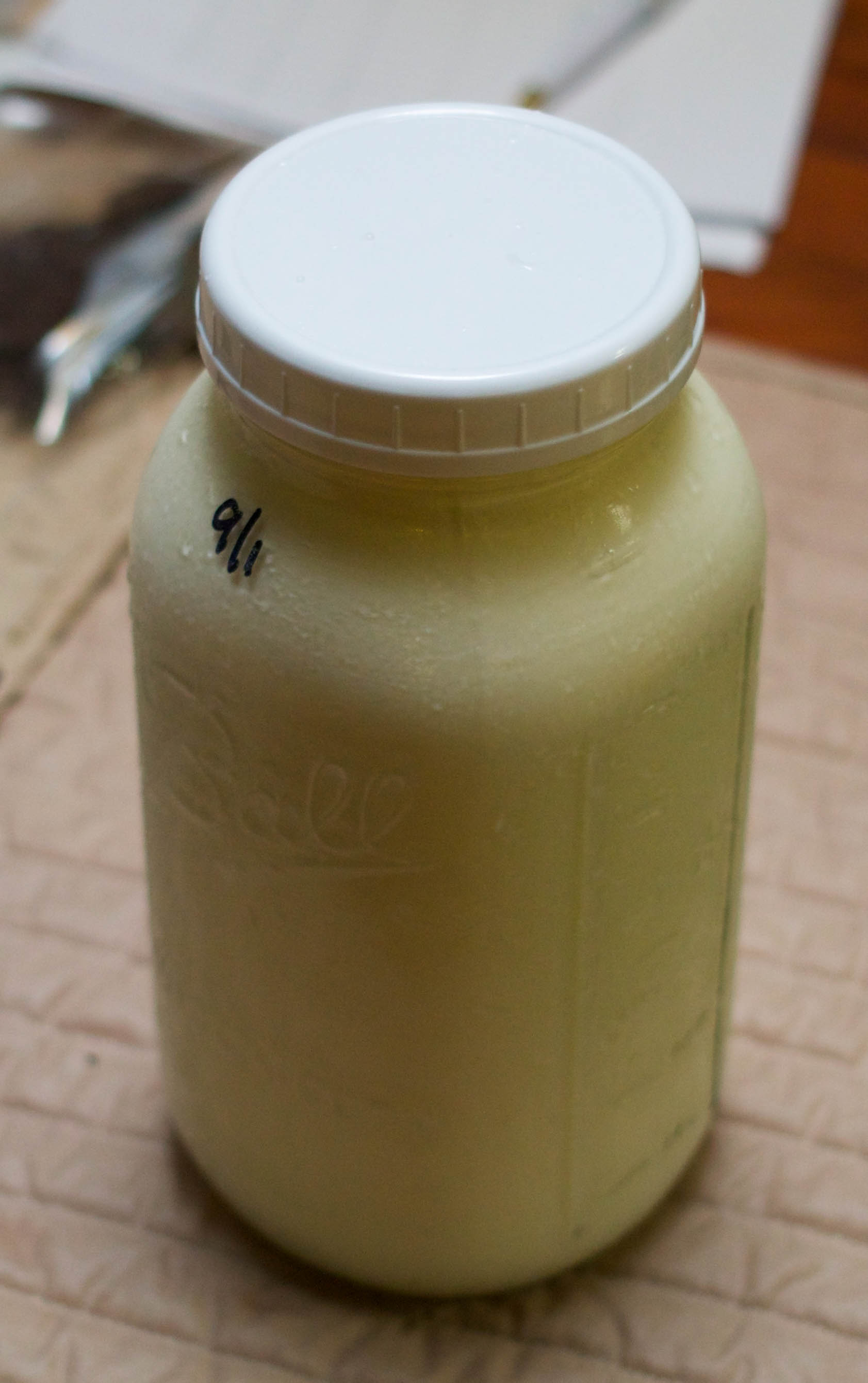
American raw milk

Humans first regularly consumed the milk of other mammals following the domestication of animals during the Neolithic Revolution or the development of agriculture. This development occurred independently in several places around the world from as early as 9000–7000 BC in Mesopotamia to 3500–3000 BC in the Americas. The most important dairy animals—cattle, sheep and goats—were first domesticated in Mesopotamia, although domestic cattle have been independently derived from wild aurochs populations several times since. From there, dairy animals spread to Europe (beginning around 7000 BC but not reaching Britain and Scandinavia until after 4000 BC), and South Asia (7000–5500 BC).

Pasteurization is widely used to prevent infected milk from entering the food supply. The pasteurization process was developed in 1864 by French scientist Louis Pasteur, who discovered that heating beer and wine was enough to kill most of the bacteria that caused spoilage, preventing these beverages from turning sour. The process achieves this by eliminating pathogenic microbes and lowering microbial numbers to improve shelf life.

After sufficient scientific study led to the development of germ theory, pasteurization was introduced in the United States in the 1890s. This move successfully controlled the spread of highly contagious bacterial diseases, including E. coli, bovine tuberculosis, and brucellosis, all transmitted to humans through the drinking of infected raw milk. In the early days after the scientific discovery of bacteria, there was no product testing to determine whether a farmer's milk was safe or infected, so all milk was treated as potentially contagious. After the first tests were developed, some farmers took steps to prevent their infected animals from being killed and removed from food production, sometimes even falsifying test results to make their animals appear free of infection. Advances in the analysis of milk-borne diseases have enabled scientists to track the DNA of infectious bacteria in raw milk to the cows on the farms that supplied it.

The recognition of many potentially deadly pathogens, such as E. coli 0157 H7, Campylobacter, Listeria, and Salmonella, and their possible presence in poorly produced milk products has led to the continuation of pasteurization. The U.S. Department of Health and Human Services, Centers for Disease Control and Prevention, and other health agencies of the United States strongly recommend that the public not consume raw milk or raw milk products. Young children, the elderly, people with weakened immune systems, and pregnant women are particularly susceptible to infections originating in raw milk.

== Uses ==
Some cheeses are produced with raw milk, although local statutes vary regarding required health precautions. There have been many reports of infections caused by raw milk cheese.

The first camembert was made from raw milk, and the Appellation d'origine contrôlée (AOC) variety "Camembert de Normandie" (approximately 10% of all camembert production) is required by law to be made only with unpasteurized milk. Raw milk cheeses have been described as having richer taste and aroma, and as being of high value for consumers. Many modern cheesemakers, however, use pasteurized milk for safety, regulations, or convenience.

A thick mixture known as syllabub was created by milkmaids squirting milk directly from a cow into a container of cider, beer or other beverage.

Raw yak milk can ferment overnight to become a yoghurt-like substance, which can then be churned into yak butter.

== Health effects ==
=== Infectivity ===
The potential pathogenic bacteria from raw milk include tuberculosis (TB), diphtheria, typhoid, Campylobacter, Listeria, Brucella, E. coli, Salmonella, and streptococcal infections and make it potentially unsafe to consume. Raw milk may also contain parasites such as Cryptosporidium. Groups of people that are at especially high risk for developing illness from consuming raw milk include children under the age of 5, adults over the age of 65, pregnant women, and people who have a weakened immune system. Many of these disorders are often, despite the advances in modern medicine, hard to diagnose (examples include TB and Brucellosis), and sometimes hard to treat.

Moreover, a review published in 2012 by the Belgian Federal Agency for the Safety of the Food Chain alongside experts from several Belgian universities and institutions concluded that "raw milk poses a realistic health threat due to possible contamination with human pathogens. It is therefore strongly recommended that milk should be heated before consumption."

Even with precautions and cold storage (optimally 3–4 °C or 37–39 °F), raw milk has a shelf life of 3 to 5 days.

A 2024 study showed that the Influenza A virus can survive in refrigerated raw milk for several days.

The 2020–2025 H5N1 outbreak spread to dairy cattle in 2024, and influenza was detected in commercial milk supplies in the United States. The United States Food and Drug Administration warned (as has been its long-standing position) that consumers should avoid raw milk because its ability to transmit influenza to humans is unknown. Pasteurization is believed to inactivate the virus. A high mortality rate was observed among cats that drank raw milk from cows displaying symptoms of H5N1 infection.

=== Epidemiology ===
Before pasteurized milk was adopted in the US, public health officials were concerned with cow milk transmission of bovine tuberculosis to humans, with an estimated 10% of all tuberculosis cases in humans being attributed to milk consumption. Along with specific diseases, officials continue to be concerned about outbreaks. With modern pasteurization and sanitation practices, milk accounts for less than 1% of reported outbreaks caused by food and water consumption. By comparison, raw milk was associated with 25% of all disease outbreaks from food/water during the time before World War II in the U.S. From a public health standpoint, pasteurization has decreased the percentage of milk-associated food/waterborne outbreaks.

Between 2007 and 2016, there were 144 outbreaks connected to raw milk consumption in the United States. Because raw milk production skips the pasteurization process, the germs that are normally removed remain in the milk product. Exposure to raw milk containing harmful bacteria raises the risk of serious infection, including Campylobacter, Cryptosporidium, E. coli, Listeria, and Salmonella. Additionally, depending on the severity of the infection, there may be further threats to human health. Infection has the potential to induce serious illnesses such as Guillain-Barré syndrome and Hemolytic–uremic syndrome (HUS). These illnesses can lead to severe health complications, such as kidney failure, strokes, and death.

Outbreaks have occurred from consuming food products made with raw milk. One of the potential pathogens in raw milk, Listeria monocytogenes, can survive pasteurization and contaminate post-pasteurization environments. Milk and dairy products made with that milk then become recontaminated. Consistent contamination persists due to bacterial survival in biofilms within the processing systems.

One food item that commonly uses raw milk in its production is cheese. Several different types of cheeses made with raw milk are consumed by a large portion of the United States population, including soft cheeses. Since Gouda cheese is aged for 60 days before its sale it had been hypothesized that no bacteria would then survive, but a review study published in the Journal of Food Protection showed that E. coli O157:H7 can persist through the aging period of Gouda cheese. The study's evidence included three outbreaks before 2013 associated with this specific strain of E. coli in Gouda.

Prevention of outbreaks

A 2018 study found raw milk to be responsible for almost three times more cases than any other food-borne illness. Public health strategies aimed at reducing the risks associated with raw milk consumption focus on individual and systemic safeguards. Pasteurization is the most effective method of preventing food-borne illnesses from raw milk. With public health implications in mind, health professionals need to understand the need for pasteurization. Introducing on-farm food safety training programs for raw milk producers can be an effective risk management option. Infections in animals can be prevented by vaccination and regular veterinary check-ups. Organizations, including the World Health Organization and the Food and Drug Administration, consistently advise against consuming raw milk due to the associated health risks.

=== Nutrition and allergy ===
"With the exception of an altered organoleptic [flavor] profile, heating (particularly ultra-high temperature and similar treatments) will not substantially change the nutritional value of raw milk or other benefits associated with raw milk consumption."

Raw milk advocates, such as the Weston A. Price Foundation, say that raw milk can be produced hygienically and that it has health benefits that are destroyed in the pasteurization process. Research has found no evidence to support this claim, and data shows only very slight differences in the nutritional values of pasteurized and unpasteurized milk.

Proponents of raw milk in the US have said that while pasteurization may kill dangerous bacteria, it also kills beneficial bacteria not present in pasteurized milk, but the United States Food and Drug Administration has stated that this is false and that pasteurizing milk does not destroy any of its nutritional value.

Three studies found an inverse relationship between consuming raw milk and asthma and allergies. However, all of these studies have been performed in children living on farms and living a farming lifestyle, rather than comparing urban children living typical urban lifestyles and with typical urban exposures based on consumption or nonconsumption of raw milk. Aspects of the overall urban vs. farming lifestyle have been suggested as having a role in these differences. For this reason, the overall phenomenon has been named the "farm effect". A recent scientific review concluded that "most studies alluding to a possible protective effect of raw milk consumption do not contain any objective confirmation of the raw milk's status or a direct comparison with heat-treated milk. Moreover, it seems that the observed increased resistance seems to be rather related to the exposure to a farm environment or to animals than to raw milk consumption." For example, in the largest of these studies, exposure to cows and straw as well as raw milk were associated with lower rates of asthma and exposure to animal feed storage rooms and manure with lower rates of atopic dermatitis; "the effect on hay fever and atopic sensitization could not be completely explained by the questionnaire items themselves or their diversity."

== Legal status ==
Regulation of the commercial distribution of packaged raw milk varies globally. Some countries have complete bans, but many do not restrict the purchase of raw milk directly from the farmer. Raw milk is sometimes distributed through a program in which the consumer owns a share in the dairy animal or the herd and, therefore, can be considered to be consuming milk from their own animal, which is legal. Raw milk is sometimes marketed for animal or pet consumption or for other uses such as soap making in places where sales for human consumption are prohibited.

=== Africa ===
Milk consumption in Africa varies across different cultures. Dairy consumption accounted for approximately 2.4 percent of total calories in Africa (below the 9.8 and 9.0 percent seen in North America and Europe) in 2015-2017, but has significant variations by region and culture. The top six African milk producing countries in terms of milk volume are Sudan, Egypt, Kenya, Ethiopia, South Africa, and Algeria.

In tribes where milk consumption is popular, such as the Maasai tribe in Tanzania, milk is typically consumed unpasteurized.

In Kenya in 2018, only 15% of milk was processed, and the remaining 85% was consumed raw. Of this 85%, farmers and their families consume 40%. The Dairy Industry Regulations (2021) by the Kenya Dairy Board regulate the sale of raw milk.

In Somalia, camel milk is popular. It is traditionally consumed raw or fermented.

South Africa permits the sale of raw milk and regulates it according to the "Milk and Dairy Products Regulations- GN R 1555." However, researchers posit there are gaps in implementation.

=== Asia ===
In rural areas of Asia, where milk consumption is popular, milk is typically unpasteurized. In large Asian cities, raw milk is typical, especially from water buffalo. In most Asian countries, laws prohibiting raw milk are nonexistent or rarely enforced. Milk labeled as "raw" (nama) is available in Japan. Still, the designation means it is 100% raw, whole milk before being pasteurized. Unpasteurized milk is very uncommon in Japan. In Singapore, the sale of raw milk for human consumption is prohibited due to safety concerns outlined by the Singapore Food Agency.

In India, milk is often drunk raw, although milk supplied in major cities is sometimes pasteurized. Pasteurized or not, milk is often boiled in homes before consumption.

=== Europe ===
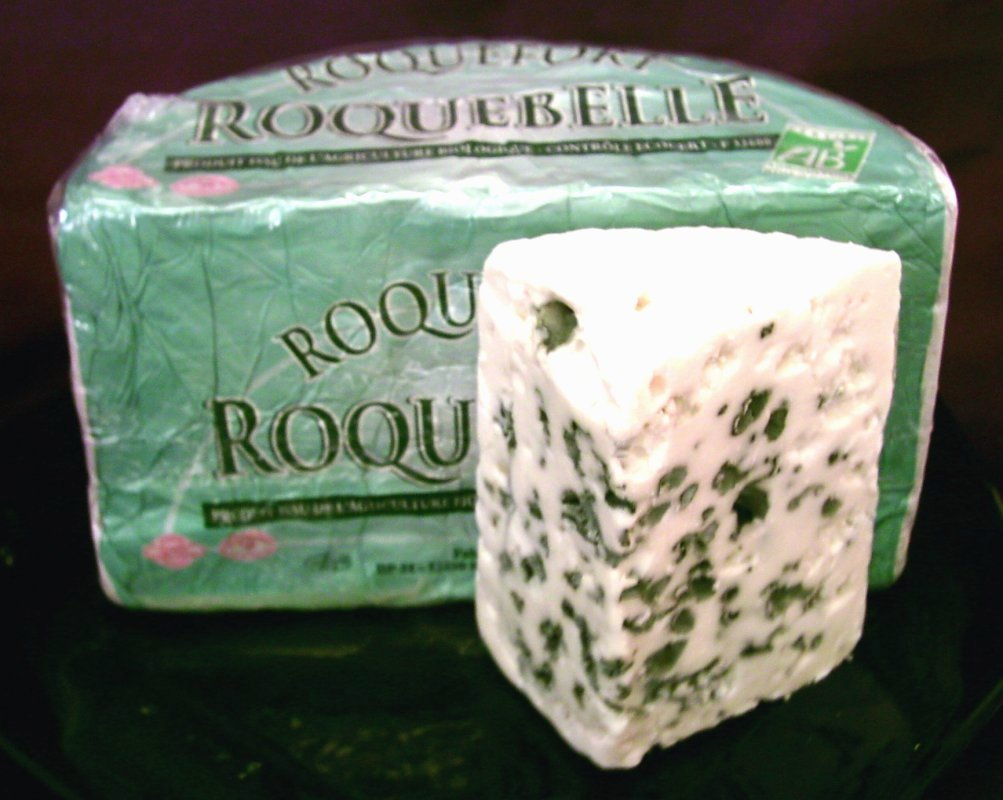
French roquefort, a famous blue cheese, which is required by European Union law to be made from raw sheep's milk

In the European Union, raw milk and products made with raw milk must be labeled to indicate this. Under EU hygiene rules, member states can prohibit or restrict the placing on the market of raw milk intended for human consumption. Individual member states can also implement stricter requirements. Usually, special sanitary regulations and frequent quality tests (at least once per month) are mandatory.

==== Austria ====
Raw milk may be sold in Austria, but can only be delivered directly by the farmer to the final consumer or to retail companies and by those retail companies directly to the final consumer.

==== France ====
Raw milk cheeses make up about 18 percent of France's total cheese production. They are considered far superior to cheeses made from pasteurized milk. Many French cuisine traditionalists consider pasteurized cheeses almost a sacrilege. Many traditional French cheeses have been made solely from raw milk for centuries. Unpasteurised cheese in France is the major source of staphylococcal food poisoning.

==== Germany ====
In Germany, packaged raw milk may be sold in shops under the name Vorzugsmilch. The raw milk has to be packed before vending, with the necessary information (producer, shelf life, and special warnings) written on the product. The distribution license has stringent quality restrictions; as of 2012, just 80 farmers in Germany had a license.

Unpackaged raw milk may only be sold under specific conditions. It must:

- only be sold at the farm where it was produced
- be from the day of, or the previous day's production
- have a warning label "Raw Milk – boil before use."
- not be used in communal kitchens.

==== Ireland ====
In the Republic of Ireland, the sale and production of raw milk is legal and regulated by the Department of Agriculture. While raw milk was previously banned in Irish law, since 2015, raw milk production has been regulated per the European Communities (Food and Feed Hygiene) Regulations (2009). Farmers wishing to produce more than 30 litres (6.6 imp gal; 7.9 US gal) of raw milk for human consumption are required to register with the department's Milk Hygiene Division and consent to random sampling of their products as well as regular inspections of their production facilities. The sale and consumption of raw milk has been discouraged by various food safety experts, including the Food Safety Authority of Ireland.

==== Nordic states ====
Shops are not permitted to sell unpasteurised milk to consumers in Norway, Sweden and Denmark. In Finland, sale of packaged raw milk is permitted in shops. All four countries allow limited "barn door" sales subject to strict controls. As of 2015, just one distributor in Denmark is licensed to supply restaurants with raw milk from approved farms. Pasteurisation of milk has been common practice in Denmark and Sweden since the mid-1880s.

==== Slovenia ====
Raw milk has been available from refrigerated milk vending machines (mlekomati) all over the country since 2010. The milk sold in the machines is subject to stringent regular control.

As of 2018, raw milk is also available in shops. The Slovenian National Institute of Public Health advises that consuming fresh milk from a milk machine that is not heat-treated (boiled) can pose a health risk.

==== Spain ====
The sale of raw milk to consumers has been illegal in Spain since 1990. In the autonomous community of Catalonia, it has been legal to sell raw milk since 2018. There had been proposals under previous Spanish governments to legalize the sale nationwide. This was suspended indefinitely in 2018.

==== Turkey ====
Raw milk is sold in Turkey, usually in local markets or by producers in villages. At these points of sale, raw milk is usually offered to the consumer in glass bottles or plastic containers. Businesses that produce raw milk in Turkey must undergo regular health checks, per government regulations.

==== United Kingdom ====
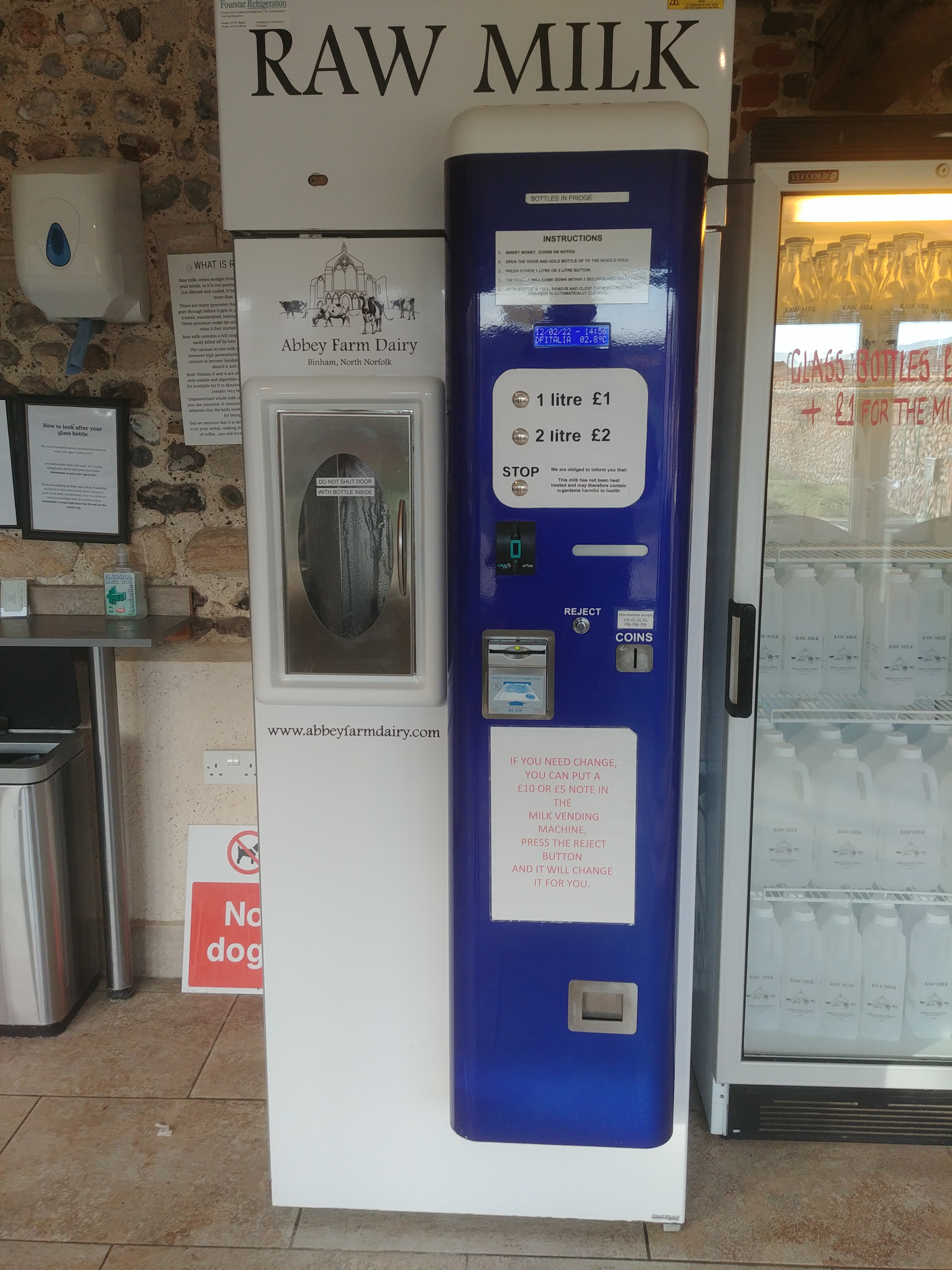
Raw Milk Vending Machine, Norfolk, UK

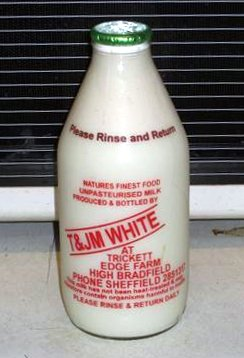
A bottle of green top milk in the UK, with the warning that "this milk has not been heat-treated and may contain organisms harmful to health"

About 150 producers of raw milk are listed with the Food Standards Agency in England, Wales, and Northern Ireland. They are permitted to sell raw "green top" milk directly to consumers at the farm or a farmers' market, or delivered. The bottle must display the warning "this product has not been heat-treated and may contain organisms harmful to health", and the milk must be produced to higher hygiene standards than dairies producing only pasteurised milk. However, unpasteurized raw milk has not been permitted to be sold in a supermarket or high-street shop since 1985.

In Scotland, since 1983, it has been an offence to offer raw cow's milk or cream for sale for direct consumption since a spate of deaths; the ban was extended to milk from all other farm animals in 2006.

=== North America ===
==== Canada ====
The sale of raw milk directly to consumers has been prohibited in Canada under the Food and Drug Regulations since 1991.

No person shall sell the normal lacteal secretion obtained from the mammary gland of the cow, genus Bos, or of any other animal, or sell a dairy product made with any such secretion, unless the secretion or dairy product has been pasteurized by being held at a temperature and for a period that ensure the reduction of the alkaline phosphatase activity to meet the tolerances specified in official method MFO-3, Determination of Phosphatase Activity in Dairy Products, dated November 30, 1981.

— Section B.08.002.2 (1)

Provincial laws also forbid the sale and distribution of raw milk. For instance, Ontario's Health Protection and Promotion Act, subsection 18(1) reads: "No person shall sell, offer for sale, deliver or distribute milk or cream that has not been pasteurized or sterilized in a plant that is licensed under the Milk Act or in a plant outside Ontario that meets the standards for plants licensed under the Milk Act."

In January 2010, Michael Schmidt faced 19 charges relating to the sale of raw milk in the Ontario Court of Justice; he was found not guilty, but convicted on appeal on 13 counts, and fined CA$9,150 and sentenced to one year of probation,upheld on appeal.

In British Columbia, Alice Jongerden, together with Michael Schmidt and Gordon Watson, involved in the operation of her raw milk dairy, attempted to avoid enforcement of a judgement against them under the Public Health Act by challenging the constitutionality of the legislation, which deems raw milk to be a hazardous product, on the grounds that it violated the Canadian Charter of Rights and Freedoms. This and other arguments were rejected in 2013 by the Supreme Court of British Columbia, which found Schmidt and Watson guilty of civil contempt and gave them a 3-month suspended sentence, plus costs.

Canada permits the sale of raw milk cheese aged over 60 days. In 2009, the province of Quebec modified regulations to allow raw milk cheeses aged less than 60 days, provided stringent safeguards were met.

==== United States ====
Legality of raw milk per state. Legal through retail sales Legal through farm sales Legal through herdshares Legal for animal consumption Legal for goat's milk only Legal through doctor's approval Legal through state commission Illegal

In the early 20th century, many states within the United States allowed the sale of raw milk that was certified by a "medical milk commission", effectively allowing an alternative of extra inspection for pasteurization. Most states impose restrictions on raw milk suppliers due to safety concerns. 43 U.S. states allow the sale of raw milk. Cow shares can be found, and raw milk purchased for animal consumption in many states where retail for human consumption is prohibited. The sale of raw milk cheese is permitted if the cheese has been aged for at least 60 days.

In 1987, the U.S. Food and Drug Administration (FDA) banned the sale of raw milk intended for human consumption across state borders.

The FDA reported that, in 2002, consuming raw milk and raw milk products that had not been thoroughly heated caused 200 Americans to fall ill.

Most public health organizations, including the CDC, hold to the need for pasteurization. Many dairies, especially in cities, fed their cattle on low-quality feed and produced raw milk containing dangerous bacteria; pasteurizing it was the only way to make it safely drinkable. The Cornell University Food Science Department compiled data indicating that pathogenic microorganisms are present in between 0.87% and 12.6% of raw milk samples.

Proponents of selling raw milk invoke the benefits of direct marketing by farmers to consumers, eliminating intermediaries for greater profitability. Many manufacturers sell small-scale pasteurization equipment, allowing farmers to bypass the milk processors and sell pasteurized milk directly. Additionally, as of 2010 some small U.S. dairies were adopting low-temperature vat pasteurization, whose advocates note that it produces a product of composition similar to raw milk.

Food freedom advocates cite libertarian arguments and claim a basic civil right of people to weigh the risks and benefits of choosing their food, including raw milk.. Robert F. Kennedy Jr, American Health Secretary during the second presidency of Donald Trump, supports raw milk consumption.

=== Oceania ===
==== Australia ====
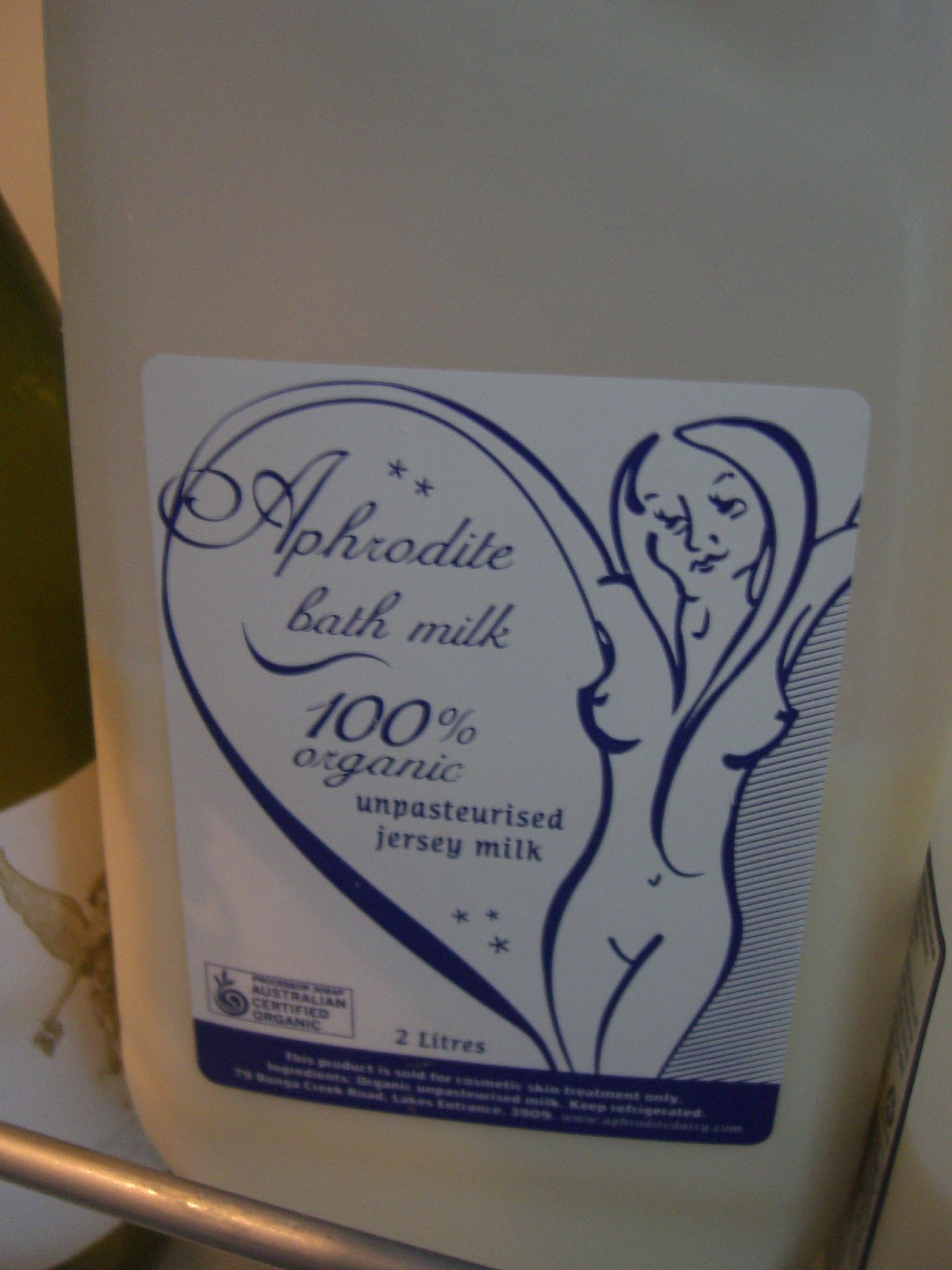
Australian raw milk sold as "bath milk"

The sale of raw milk for drinking purposes is illegal in all states and territories in Australia, since the 1940s, as is all raw milk cheese. This has been circumvented somewhat by selling raw milk as bath milk. An exception to the cheese rule has been made for two French cheeses and twelve cheeses from the United Kingdom. There is some indication of share owning cows, allowing the "owners" to consume the raw milk, but also evidence that the government is trying to close this loophole.

On 8 November 2015, four-year-old Apu Khangura died of hemolytic–uremic syndrome, and seven other children became seriously ill following the consumption of raw milk. In response, the Victorian government created new regulations that require producers to treat raw milk to reduce pathogens or to make the product unpalatable to taste, such as making it bitter.

==== New Zealand ====
Raw milk for drinking and raw milk products can be produced and sold in New Zealand, but are highly regulated to offset the pathogen risk. Producers of raw milk for sale to consumers must be registered. Raw milk must either be collected by the purchaser from the producer's farm or delivered to the purchaser's home.

=== South America ===
In Brazil, selling raw milk has been banned since 1969.

== One Health considerations ==
The risks associated with raw milk consumption can be better understood through a One Health framework, which recognizes the interconnectedness of human, animal, and environmental health. Pathogens such as Salmonella, Escherichia coli, and Listeria monocytogenes may originate in livestock and be transmitted to humans through contaminated milk. In dairy cattle, infections such as mastitis can increase the likelihood of bacterial contamination during milk production.

Environmental factors also play a significant role in the transmission of pathogens. Improper manure management, contaminated water sources, and agricultural runoff can introduce or amplify microbial contamination in dairy production systems. These environmental pathways may contribute to both direct contamination of milk and indirect exposure through crops and water.

From a public health perspective, the consumption of unpasteurized milk has been associated with outbreaks of foodborne illness, particularly among vulnerable populations such as children, the elderly, and immunocompromised individuals. Prevention strategies, therefore, require coordinated efforts across multiple sectors, including veterinary health, environmental management, and food safety regulation.

A One Health approach emphasizes integrated interventions, such as improving animal health monitoring, ensuring proper sanitation and manure handling practices, and promoting pasteurization to reduce the risk of zoonotic disease transmission.

== See also ==
- Gut flora
- Medical ethics
- Hygiene hypothesis
- Raw foodism
- Infant food safety
