= 2013 Fonterra recall =

Wide-scale recall of Fonterra products

In 2013, a wide-scale recall of products sold by dairy producer Fonterra was announced after suspected botulism-causing bacteria were found during safety tests. The contaminated whey products had been sold to third parties who use it to produce infant formula and sports drinks. Approximately 1,000 tonnes of consumer product was affected by the recall across seven countries, but no cases of sickened consumers were reported. China, which imports most of its powdered milk from New Zealand, instituted a temporary ban on the import of the ingredient from New Zealand.

The scandal resulted in the resignation of Fonterra's head of its milk business division, Gary Romano.

The bacteria were ultimately found not to be a botulism-causing strain.

== Background ==
Based in New Zealand, Fonterra Cooperative Group is the world's fourth largest producer of dairy products, with a turnover of nearly NZ$ 20 billion (US$15.7 billion). The company was formed in 2001 following the merger of the country's two largest dairy cooperatives, and controls 95% of New Zealand's dairy market.

New Zealand produces 15 million tonnes of dairy products annually, of which 5% is consumed domestically and 95% is exported to other countries. Dairy exports contribute NZ$11 billion directly to the New Zealand economy, or around 7% of the country's gross domestic profit. Because of New Zealand's excellent safety history, consumers are willing to pay a premium for its dairy products. Chinese manufacturers in particular are major buyers of Fonterra products as many citizens have concerns about the safety of domestic dairy products in the wake of the 2008 Chinese milk scandal, in which melamine sickened thousands of people.

Botulism is a rare disease caused by Clostridium botulinum bacteria. A small number of the bacteria can cause severe poisoning leading to respiratory and muscular problems in adults. In infants, the toxin also affects the intestinal system.

== Recall ==
On 3 August 2013, the Ministry for Primary Industries announced a recall of products sold by Fonterra. The contaminated products originated with three batches of whey protein concentrate weighing 38 metric tons (42 tons) produced in May 2012. A problem was first noticed by Fonterra in March 2013 when testing suggested the possible presence of Clostridium, a sometimes-dangerous class of bacteria which is often harmless. On 31 July 2013, tests revealed signs of Clostridium botulinum, leading to the recall. The contamination was blamed on unsterilised pipes used to move the whey during production.

The whey had been sold to third-party manufacturers who used it to produce infant formula, protein drinks, sports drinks, and other beverages; it had been mixed with other ingredients to produce an estimated 1,000 tons of consumer products by the time of the recall. No fresh dairy products were affected by the contaminated pipes.

Manufacturers in Australia, China, Malaysia, New Zealand, Saudi Arabia, Thailand, and Vietnam were affected by the recall, but the specific companies affected were not identified by the Ministry of Primary Industries. A Chinese consumer watchdog group said four domestic manufacturers – Dumex Baby Food Company, two subsidiaries of beverage manufacturer Wahaha Group, and Shanghai Sugar, Tobacco and Alcohol – had potentially imported contaminated products. Fonterra said that Coca-Cola's Chinese subsidiary was also affected. Coca-Cola said 4,775 out of 4,800 kilograms (10,600 lb) of contaminated whey had been quarantined before being used. The remainder was used in a single batch of Minute Maid Pulpy Milk, which was recalled to reassure consumers even though it posed no health risk since the drink was heat treated to kill bacteria.

Internationally, eight companies were affected – three food companies, two beverage companies, and three animal-feed producers. Danone Dumex Malaysia said tests on its products did not indicate any contamination, but announced a precautionary recall of four batches of infant formula. One affected product, Karicare formula made by Nutricia, was sold directly to consumers by Fonterra in New Zealand. On 9 August, it was revealed that Fonterra had donated a 12 kg (26 lb) bag of the affected whey concentrate to Palmerston North Girls' High School, in the eponymous New Zealand city, for use in a science project back in February 2013. Around 25 students drank drinks made with the concentrate in April, but no ill effects were reported.

Fonterra CEO Theo Spierings promised swift action to ensure that potentially dangerous products were not used by consumers. Since most of the consumer products affected are not manufactured by Fonterra, individual manufacturers are responsible for co-ordinating the recall efforts in their areas. Spierings travelled to China to deal with the fallout from the botulism scare.

The Government reaction involved five ministers, with the Economic Development Minister Steven Joyce, known as the "Minister of Everything" or "Mr Fixit", in charge (he is also responsible for investigating the Novopay debacle). A Government inquiry is expected to be announced on Monday 12 August.

== Reaction ==
=== China ===
China's General Administration of Quality Supervision, Inspection and Quarantine ordered importers to recall any potentially infected products and demanded "that New Zealand take immediate measures to prevent problem products harming the health of Chinese consumers." On 4 August, China temporarily blocked the import of all milk powder products from New Zealand. New Zealand's trade minister, Tim Groser, agreed with the decision calling it "absolutely appropriate". China imports US$1.9 billion of milk powder a year, 90 percent of which originates in New Zealand. Economists said an extended ban could cause a shortage of infant formula and other dairy products in China.

=== Thailand ===
Thailand ordered a recall of all Fonterra products imported since May. Reports by the RIA Novosti news agency indicated that Russia, which was not part of the official recall, also halted the import and sale of Fonterra products. Fonterra called the reports "unconfirmed". The company said that all affected batches of Nutricia are believed to have been secured before reaching consumers' hands. Groser said the government had serious questions about how the contamination occurred and why it went undetected for so long.

=== Sri Lanka ===
Health ministry of Sri Lanka issued an island-wide recall of all suspected milk stocks which were imported from New Zealand including Anchor. The Health Services Director General of Sri Lanka announced contaminated milk products ban under Food Act Number 26 of 1980 using his powers in consultation with the Food Advisory Committee. Also, on 8 August, the Court of Appeal of Sri Lanka issued an Interim Order compelling the Consumer Affairs Authority (CAA) to prevent Fonterra Brands Lanka (Pvt) Ltd., from publishing any advertisements. No cases of consumers being sickened have been reported. A statement by New Zealand prime minister John Key expressed doubt about Sri Lanka's testing methods (for DCD).

=== France ===
French food company Danone, which owns the Nutricia brand, was said to be seeking upwards of €300 million in damages following the scare, despite Fonterra only setting aside $NZ14 million.

== Aftermath ==
Further testing showed that the bacteria found were Clostridium sporogenes, which do not produce botulism toxins. There was no actual health risk, and the crisis was a false alarm.

The Ministry for Primary Industries brought four charges against Fonterra under the Animal Products Act concerning its risk-management programme and delayed notification of problems. Fonterra pleaded guilty to all charges and was fined NZ$300,000 in April 2014. A government investigation into the crisis and three other inquiries are continuing.

== See also ==
- 2008 Chinese milk scandal
- 2022 United States infant formula shortage
