= Five-second rule =

Western cultural food hygiene myth

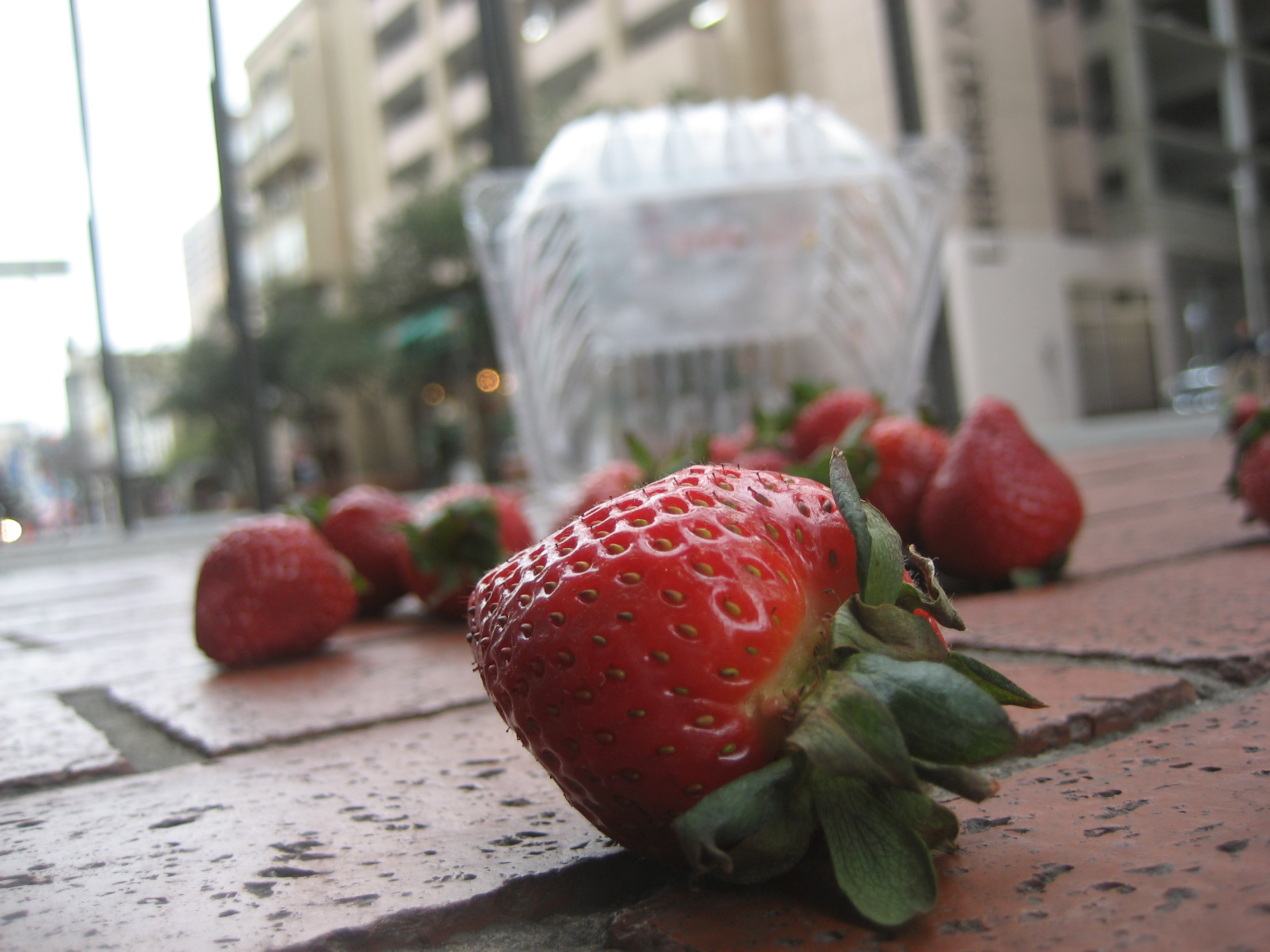
Strawberries dropped on the ground. The five-second rule suggests that if they are picked up within five seconds, it is safe to eat them without rewashing.

The five-second rule, or sometimes the three-second rule, is a debunked food hygiene urban legend that states a defined time window after which it is not safe to eat food (or sometimes to use cutlery) after it has been dropped on the floor or on the ground and thus exposed to contamination.

While the amount of microbes transferred to a dropped food does increase over time, and in some situations floors may be relatively clean of pathogens, the scientific consensus is opposed to such a general applied rule, and the origin of the idea is unclear. It is speculated to have originated from legends about Genghis Khan. It was first mentioned in print in 1995.

== History ==
Genghis Khan is said to have ruled that food dropped on the floor "could stay there as long as Khan allowed"

The origins of the five-second rule are unclear. Food scientist Pawl Dawson and microbiologist Brian Sheldon have traced the origins to legends surrounding Genghis Khan in the 15th century. He is rumored to have implemented the "Khan Rule" at his banquets. "If food fell on the floor, it could stay there as long as Khan allowed," and the idea was that "food prepared for Khan was so special that it would be good for anyone to eat no matter what."

The first known mention of the myth in modern print was in the 1995 novel Wanted: Rowing Coach as a "twenty-second rule".

== Research ==
The five-second rule has received some scholarly attention. It has been studied as both a public health recommendation and a sociological effect.

=== University of Illinois ===
In 2003, Jillian Clarke, a high school student in an apprenticeship, investigated the rule. She found 56% of men and 70% of women surveyed were familiar with the five-second rule. She also determined that a variety of foods were significantly contaminated by even brief exposure to a tile inoculated with E. coli. On the other hand, Clarke found no significant evidence of contamination on public flooring. For this work, Clarke received the 2004 Ig Nobel Prize in public health.

A more thorough study in 2007 using salmonella on wood, tiles, and nylon carpet found that the bacteria could thrive under dry conditions even after twenty-eight days. Tested on surfaces that had been contaminated with salmonella eight hours previously, the bacteria could still contaminate bread and baloney lunchmeat in under five seconds. But a minute-long contact increased contamination about tenfold (especially on tile and carpet surfaces).

=== Rutgers University ===
Researchers at Rutgers University debunked the theory in 2016 by dropping watermelon cubes, gummy candies, plain white bread, and buttered bread from a height of five inches (13 cm) onto surfaces slathered in Enterobacter aerogenes. The surfaces used were carpet, ceramic tile, stainless steel and wood. The food was left on the surface for intervals of 5, 30 and 300 seconds. The scientists assessed the amount of E. aerogenes transferred between surface and food. Since bacteria tended to be attracted to moisture, wet food had more risk to have bacteria transferred than dry food. To the surprise of the researchers, carpet transferred fewer bacteria than steel or tile. Wood was hard to pin down as it showed a large variation. "The five-second rule is a significant oversimplification of what actually happens when bacteria transfer from a surface to food," Donald Schaffner, a Rutgers University biologist and an author of the research, stated in the Washington Post, "Bacteria can contaminate instantaneously."

A pediatrician criticized the study for discounting the danger in consuming food after one touches other surfaces like refrigerator handles, light switches, and wallets, which have been found to be similarly contaminated with bacteria.

=== Other ===
A 2014 study by biology students at Aston University in England suggested that there may be a basis for the five-second rule. Anthony Hilton, head of microbiology at Aston University, indicated in 2017 that food dropped on a seemingly clean floor for a few moments can be eaten with minimal risk. According to Hilton, moist foods that are left on the floor for more than 30 seconds are contaminated with 10 times more bacteria than food that has been left on the floor for 3 seconds.

=== Informal ===
The five-second rule was featured in an episode of the Discovery Channel series MythBusters, which discovered that there was no significant difference in the number of bacteria collected. An episode of Food Detectives found that bacteria will cling to food immediately.
