= Michael Schmidt (agriculture) =

Canadian dairy farmer and raw milk advocate

Michael Schmidt is a Canadian dairy farmer and advocate for raw milk. His story is documented in the film Milk War.

In January 2010, Schmidt was found not guilty on 19 charges relating to the sale of raw milk in the Ontario Court of Justice. On appeal to the Ontario Court of Justice, that decision was overturned. Schmidt was convicted on thirteen counts and imposed fines totalling $9,150 and one year of probation. A subsequent appeal to the Ontario Court of Appeal was dismissed.

In 2010, an injunction was granted against Schmidt barring him from distributing raw milk in British Columbia. In 2013, Schmidt was found guilty of contempt of that order and sentenced to 3 months of imprisonment, suspended for 1 year of probation. In 2015, his appeal was dismissed.

In 2011, Schmidt went on a five-week hunger strike to protest the judgements against him.
