= Human milk banking in North America =

A human milk bank is "a service which collects, screens, processes, and dispenses by prescription human milk donated by nursing mothers who are not biologically related to the recipient infant". As of November 2019, there are 28 milk banks in North America that are members of the Human Milk Banking Association of North America (HMBANA). They are usually housed in hospitals, although some are free standing. Members of HMBANA follow the annually revised "Guidelines for the Establishment and Operation of a Donor Human Milk Bank" which include protocols for soliciting donors and collecting, processing, and distributing the milk. In addition, some states have required standards for donor human milk banks. However, the Food and Drug Administration (FDA), states that "the FDA has not been involved in establishing these voluntary guidelines or state standards." Some of these protocols are described below.

According to a joint statement by the World Health Organization (WHO) and United Nations Children's Fund (UNICEF): "The best food for a baby who cannot be breastfed is milk expressed from the mother's breast or from another healthy mother. The best food for any baby whose own mother's milk is not available is the breastmilk of another healthy mother" (UNICEF, p. 48). "Where it is not possible for the biological mother to breast feed, the first alternative, if available, should be the use of human milk from other sources. Human milk banks should be made available in appropriate situations" (Wight, 2001).

== History ==
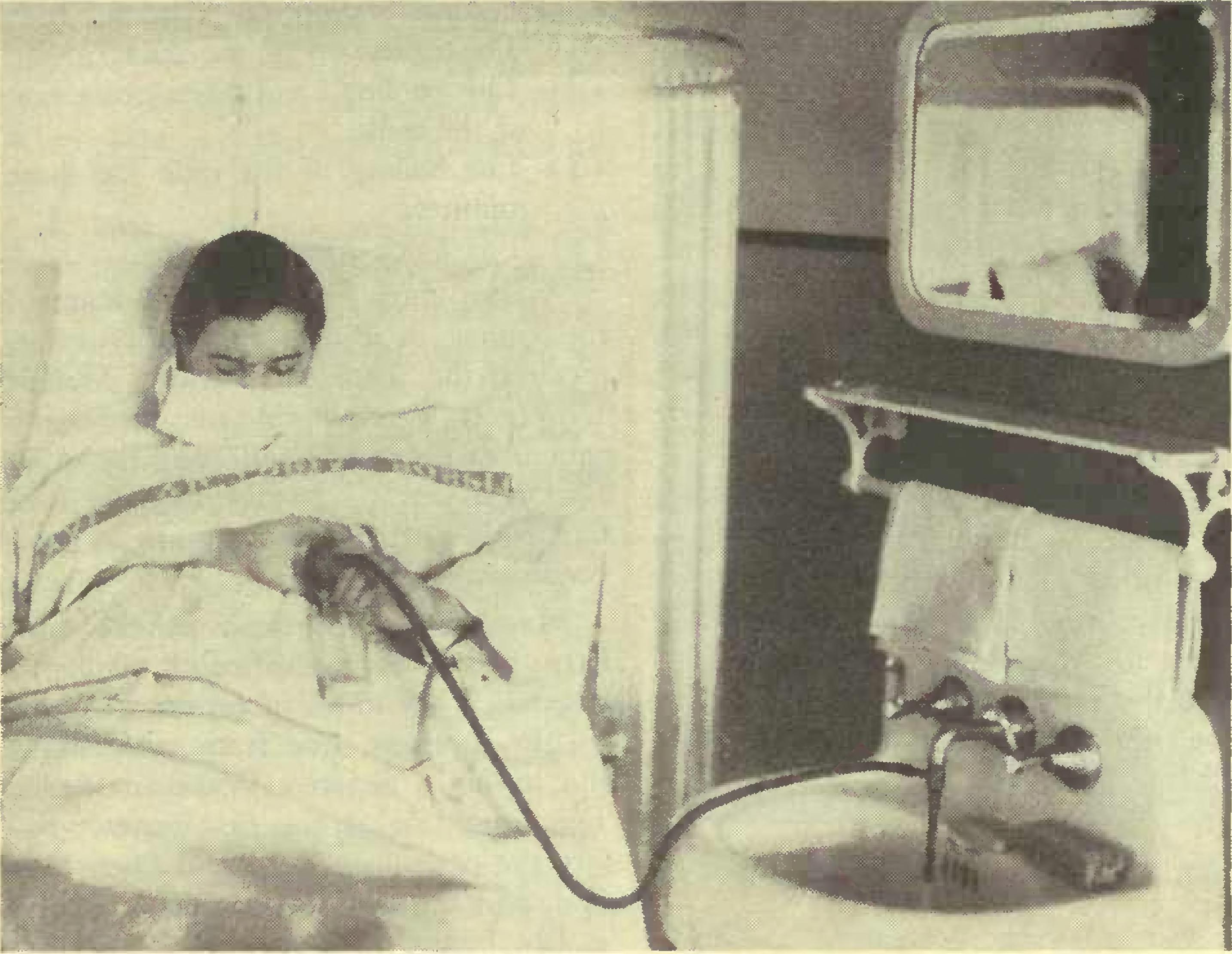
A 1930s breast pump in action on a hospital patient

The Canadian Nurse described in 1939 how nurses at the Royal Victoria Montreal Maternity Hospital travelled to Boston to learn from the successful programme at the Directory for Mother's Milk, Inc., set up by Dr Fritz Talbot. It was "a miniature dairy with all modern appliances". The quick freezing of fractions of an ounce of breastmilk had been perfected earlier that decade by researchers at Borden Labs. The women recruited were paid by the ounce, and visited daily by a nurse, as most would not have had refrigeration at home. The Maternity Hospital kept a stock of about 1000 frozen ounces.

== Screening donors ==
Milk donors are new mothers who are in good health, whose infants are growing, thriving, and under six months of age when they begin (Arnold, 1997). Some milk banks accept milk from mothers whose baby is up to two years old. Women who have given their baby up for adoption, acted as a surrogate, or are a bereaved mother may also donate. Because there is some risk of passing infections and viruses to babies through breast milk, donors must undergo a medical screening and a blood test to rule out infectious diseases such as HIV-1 and-2, hepatitis B and C and syphilis (Arnold, 1997). After administering a verbal or written questionnaire, healthcare providers for the mother and her baby must sign statements confirming that both are in good health.

The mother must not smoke or regularly use any medications, herbs, or megavitamins. If she or her baby has a common cold, she can still donate her milk. If she consumes alcohol, she must wait out an "exclusion period" of six hours for one drink or 12 hours for two drinks before expressing milk for donation. For a premature or medically fragile recipient baby, even a tiny amount of alcohol, medications, or herbs in the milk may be problematic.

== Collection ==
Methods of collection and types of containers used vary among milk banks. Donors are educated about hygienic milk expression and given containers in which to express their milk. Some milk banks have collection points where couriers pick up donations, some have mothers deliver the milk to the facility, and others ask women who live far away to freeze and ship their milk to the milk bank.

== Screening and processing milk ==
In addition to careful screening of donors, each batch of milk is tested for bacterial counts before pasteurization. Some milk banks pool milk before testing it, others test each mother's milk as it comes in before it is pooled.

Milk banks require freezers and pasteurizers for processing milk. Most milk banks have two freezers, for unprocessed and processed milk. The HMBANA guidelines state that "all milk should be heat treated for 30 minutes at 62.5 °C. Heat treatment of milk occurs at 62.5°C for 30 minutes (Holder pasteurizing)" (Arnold, 1997, p. 243). At the end of pasteurization, another sample of milk is tested to make sure the treatment was effective. Colony counts should be zero and no bacterial growth should be detected (Arnold, 1997). Containers for pasteurizing must be able to withstand heating and cooling without breakage or leaking. Most containers are recyclable, usually glass or plastic.

== Distribution ==
Donor milk is dispensed by prescription from the recipient's physician. Often, it is used within the hospital Neonatal Intensive Care Unit (NICU) for premature or critically ill babies. Sometimes, however, donor milk is shipped to recipients' homes. In these cases, it is frozen, packed in special containers, and shipped over night.

Breast milk content of mothers of premature babies differs from that of mothers of full term babies (Wight, 2001). Therefore, most milk banks separate "preemie milk" – milk collected in the first 30 days after delivery of an infant less than 36 weeks gestation – from "term milk."

== Costs ==
The HMBANA Guidelines stipulate that donors not be paid for their milk. However, hospitals and recipients are required to cover some of the cost for collection, processing and distribution of milk which may be from $3.00 to $5.00 an ounce. This remains a much lower cost than pasteurized milk can be obtained otherwise. Community fundraising and grants also help milk banks meet expenses. The guidelines ensure that no one is denied donor milk for lack of ability to pay. For non-hospitalized recipients, the milk bank will often work with the family to obtain coverage for processing fees (Arnold, 1997). However, insurance companies rarely cover donor milk, except under unusual circumstances (Griffith, 2002). In some states, and under some circumstances, Medicaid and WIC will cover the costs of using banked milk (Arnold, 1999, Wight, 2001).

When hospitals order banked milk for their NICUs it is often brought into the pharmacy and billed through the hospital. In these cases, insurance companies are much more likely to cover the processing fees than for outpatients (Arnold, 1997).

== Donors ==
Communities with milk banks use different methods to educate and solicit donors including brochures in doctors' offices and hospital information packets. Referrals also come from childbirth educators, nursing mothers groups, and La Leche League. Like blood banks, milk banks sometimes use newspaper, television and radio ads to solicit donors, especially when supplies are low (Arnold, 1997). NICUs with successful breastfeeding promotion and support often have mothers with excess milk, and they are frequently given information about how to donate their milk. In addition, mothers of infants who die sometimes choose to donate their milk.

Currently, many of the milk banks will receive milk from donors in states throughout the United States depending on their supply. Donors should always contact the closest milk bank first.

== Recipients ==
Premature infants are the most frequent recipients of donor breast milk. Full term babies with gastrointestinal (GI) disorders also sometimes receive banked milk. Occasionally, adopted babies and mothers who cannot nurse their healthy babies use banked milk as well, often at their own expense.

When there is milk available some milk banks will distribute it to adults who are immuno-compromised. Preliminary research indicates that breast milk can have nutritive, immunologic and palliative effects for cancer patients (Radetsky, 1999). Adults with GI disorders and organ donation recipients can also benefit from the immunologic powers of breast milk. More research is needed in these areas.

== Risks and mitigation ==
Two concerns are often raised by potential donor milk recipients and health care providers regarding potential risks of using banked human milk:

1. Viruses, including HIV, have been shown to transmit through breast milk. However, as mentioned above, breast milk donors are screened very carefully. In addition, each batch of milk is screened and pasteurized and retested for the presence of bacteria. "There have been no documented cases of disease transmission from donor milk provided by a milk bank operating under standard practice." (Arnold, 1999, p. 3) All of the milk banks listed below abide by the Guidelines of HMBANA. Potential donors are excluded from donating under the following circumstances:
  - Receipt of a blood product or blood transfusion, or a tissue or organ transplant within the last 12 months.
  - Regular use of more than 2 ounces of hard liquor or its equivalent in a 24-hour period.
  - Regular use of over-the-counter drugs or systemic prescriptions (replacement hormones and some birth control hormones are acceptable).
  - Use of mega-dose vitamins and/or pharmacologically active herbal preparations.
  - Total vegetarians (vegans) who do not supplement their diet with vitamins.
  - Use of illegal drugs or tobacco products.
  - Silicone breast implants
  - A history of hepatitis, systemic disorders of any kind or chronic infections (e.g. HIV, HTLV, TB) (Arnold, 1999)
2. Some of the worthwhile components of breast milk are compromised in the pasteurization process. However, many are not. "Donor milk retains its bioactivity despite partial or complete loss of some components" (Arnold, 1999, p. 3). The enzymes in breast milk (e.g. lipase) appear to be most affected by the heat. However, immune factors are less sensitive to heat and growth factors and fatty acids are stable at pasteurization temperatures. The lower the temperature at which safe processing can take place the better (Arnold, 1999). HMBANA Guidelines reflect careful research in this area.

== Milk banks ==
Below is a list of states/provinces that have HMBANA member milk banks in North America:

- Alberta (NorthernStar Mothers Milk Bank, Calgary)
- Alabama (Mothers' Milk Bank of Alabama, Birmingham, Alabama)
- British Columbia (BC Women's Provincial Milk Bank, Vancouver)
- California (*Mothers' Milk Bank, San Jose)
- Colorado (Mothers' Milk Bank at Presbyterian/St. Luke's Medical Center, Denver)
- Florida (Mothers' Milk Bank of Florida, Orlando, Florida)
- Illinois (Mothers' Milk Bank of the Great Western Lakes, Elk Grove Village, Illinois)
- Indiana (The Milk Bank, Indianapolis)
- Iowa (Mothers' Milk Bank of Iowa, Iowa City)
- Louisiana

Ochsner Baptist New Orleans

- Massachusetts (Mothers' Milk Bank Northeast, Newton Upper Falls)
- Michigan (Bronson Mothers' Milk Bank, Kalamazoo)
- Mississippi (Mothers' Milk Bank of Mississippi, Flowood, Mississippi)
- Missouri (Heart of America Mothers' Milk Bank, Kansas City)
- Montana (Mothers' Milk Bank of Montana, Missoula)
- North Carolina (WakeMed Mothers' Milk Bank and Lactation Center, Raleigh)
- Ohio (OhioHealth Mothers' Milk Bank, Columbus)
- Oklahoma (Oklahoma Mothers' Milk Bank, Oklahoma City)
- Ontario (Rogers Hixon Ontario Human Milk Bank, Toronto)
- Oregon (Northwest Mothers' Milk Bank, Portland, Oregon)
- Pennsylvania (CHOP Mothers' Milk Bank, Philadelphia; Mid-Atlantic Mothers’ Milk Bank formerly known as Three Rivers Mothers' Milk Bank, Pittsburgh and Pennsylvania)
- South Carolina (Mothers' Milk Bank of South Carolina, Charleston, South Carolina)
- Texas (Mothers' Milk Bank at Austin, Austin; Mothers' Milk Bank of North Texas, Fort Worth)
- Virginia (The King's Daughters Milk Bank, Norfolk, Virginia)

Besides the individual milk banks in the above states/provinces, HMBANA has sent donor milk to hospitals in 39 states and 3 provinces.

== Milk banking alternatives ==
Private milk donation is an alternative arrangement to milk donation through the Human Milk Banking Association of North America. Private donation is a less formal method of donation that involves direct connection between mothers donating milk and the families receiving donations. Many families engaging in private milk donation, include blood testing and complete donor screening while involving a supportive care provider. This is a modern continuation of the ancient concept of the wet nurse.

== See also ==
- Wetnurse
- Human breast milk
- Human-milk bank, covers other regions
