= Pottenger =

People with the surname Pottenger:

- Carol M. Pottenger (born 1955), a Vice Admiral in the United States Navy
- Francis M. Pottenger, Jr. (1901–1967), conducted what became known as the Pottenger Cat Study
- Orville Pottenger (1921–1978), American football player and coach
- Thomas Pottenger (1920–2003), former member of the Ohio House of Representatives

Pottenger may also refer to:

- Weston Price, the original name of the Price-Pottenger Nutrition Foundation (PPNF)
