= John Ross Callahan =

John R. Callahan
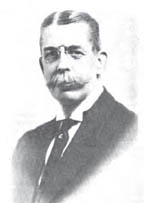
- Born: 1853; Hillsboro, Ohio, United States
- Died: January 12, 1918, aged c.65
- Known for: Research into diseases of dental pulp, methods for filling root canals.
- Awards: Member of the Institute on Dental Research of the National Dental Association; Jarvie Fellowship Medal (1917)
- Scientific career
- Fields: Dentistry, dental research

John R. Callahan (1853 – February 12, 1918) was a pioneer in the field of dentistry and particularly dental research in the late 19th and early 20th centuries.

Born in Hillsboro, Ohio in 1853, Callahan received his dental degree from the Philadelphia Dental College in 1877. He practiced dentistry in San Francisco for two years before returning to Hillsboro where he practiced until 1890. He then moved to Cincinnati, Ohio joining the practice of Dr. C. R. Taft.

In 1884 he was selected Secretary of the Ohio State Dental Society and served until 1890. In 1892 he was elected President of the Society and was a member of the Board of Directors from 1894 to 1918. He served as President of the Cincinnati Dental Society 1906–1907.

His major research was in diseases of the dental pulp. He also contributed papers on materials and methods for filling root canals; notably, chloro-percha. His original contribution of the use of sulfuric acid for opening root canals was significant at the time as were his investigations on dental materials and patient management problems.

Callahan was a member of the Institute on Dental Research of the National Dental Association. The Jarvie Fellowship Medal was awarded to him in 1917. He died on February 12, 1918.

== The Callahan Memorial Award Commission ==
To perpetuate Callahan's memory, the Ohio State Dental Society in 1920 established the Callahan Memorial Award Commission which was given two charges. First, a bronze bust of Callahan sculpted by Frederick C. Hibbard of Chicago was placed on the grounds of the Cincinnati General Hospital – in 1937 it was moved to the College of Dentistry of the Ohio State University. Second, the awarding of an Annual Callahan Memorial Award Medallion, recognizing excellence in the profession. The names of the recipients are inscribed on a bronze plaque displayed in the Ohio Dental Association headquarters.

Since 1941, the Callahan Memorial Commission has also given a scholarship prize to the highest ranking dental graduate from both Case Western Reserve University and The Ohio State University. The names of the recipients are inscribed on bronze plaques displayed in these institutions.

== Callahan Memorial Awardees ==
- 1922 – James Leon Williams
- 1923 – Frederick B. Noyes
- 1924 – Clarence J. Grives
- 1925 – Edward C. Rosenow
- 1926 – Percy R. Howe
- 1927 – Howard R. Raper
- 1928 – William J.Gies
- 1929 – Russel W. Bunting
- 1930 – Rodrigues Ottolengui
- 1931 – Weston A. Price
- 1932 – Herman Prinz
- 1933 – Homer C. Brown
- 1934 – U. Garfield Rickert
- 1935 – E.V. McCollum
- 1936 – C.N. Johnson
- 1937 – Harvey J. Burkhart
- 1938 – Joseph L.T. Appleton
- 1939 – Clarence O. Simpson
- 1940 – Arthur H. Merritt
- 1941 – Edward H. Hatton
- 1942 – Marcus L. Ward
- 1943 – Arno B. Luckhardt
- 1944 – J. Ben Robinson
- 1946 – James Roy Blayney
- 1947 – Edgar D. Coolidge
- 1948 – Herman Becks
- 1949 – Frederick S. McKay
- 1950 – Thomas J. Hill
- 1951 – Kurt H. Thoma
- 1952 – Holly Broadbent
- 1953 – Paul C. Kitchin
- 1954 – Charles F. Bodecker
- 1955 – Joseph L. Bernier
- 1956 – Edward C. Stafne
- 1957 – Allan G. Brodie
- 1958 – George C. Paffenbarger
- 1959 – Henry Trendley Dean
- 1960 – Paul H. Jeserich
- 1961 – Paul O. Pedersen
- 1962 – Clyde H. Schuyler
- 1963 – Francis A. Arnold
- 1964 – Hamilton Robinson
- 1965 – Herbert Cooper
- 1966 – Paul E. Boyle
- 1966 – Wendell D. Postle
- 1967 – Wilton M. Krogman
- 1968 – Ralph W. Phillips
- 1969 – Harold Hillenbrand
- 1970 – Carl O. Boucher
- 1971 – Donald Kerr
- 1972 – Hans H. Friehofer
- 1972 – Robert B.Shira
- 1973 – Philip E. Blackerby
- 1974 – Maynard K. Hine
- 1975 – Seymour J. Kreshover
- 1976 – Rafael L. Bowen
- 1977 – Lindsey D. Pankey
- 1978 – Robert J. Nelsen
- 1979 – Joseph F. Volker
- 1980 – Rex Ingraham
- 1981 – Wallace D. Armstrong
- 1982 – Louis J. Baume
- 1982 – Judson C.Hickey
- 1983 – William G. Shafer
- 1984 – Nelson W. Rupp
- 1985 – David B.Scott
- 1986 – Morgan L. Allison
- 1987 – Harry Lyons
- 1988 – Gardner Foley
- 1989 – Wilmer B. Eames
- 1990 – Charles McCullum
- 1991 – Alvin L. Morris
- 1992 – Julian B. Woelfel
- 1993 – D. Walter Cohen
- 1994 – Paul M. Flory
- 1995 – Harald Lõe
- 1996 – William R. Proffit
- 1997 – Irwin D. Mandel
- 1998 – Gordon J. Christensen
- 1998 – Samuel D. Harris
- 1999 – Arthur S. Dugoni
- 2000 – Burton C. Borgelt
- 2001 – Harold C. Slavkin
- 2002 – Lawrence H. Meskin
- 2003 – Clifton O. Dummett
- 2004 – Linda C. Niessen
- 2004 – P.I. Brañemark
- 2005 – Robert J. Genco
- 2006 – Jeanne Sinkford
- 2007 – Bernard Machen
- 2008 – Roy Page
- 2009 – Lysle Johnston
- 2010 – Jack Gottschalk
- 2011 – Dushanka Kleinman
- 2012 – Dominick P. DePaola
- 2013 – Sol Siverman
- 2014 – Marcia Boyd
- 2015 – Stanley Bergman
- 2022 – Domenick Zero
- 2023 – James Vaden
