= Francis M. Pottenger =

Francis M. Pottenger may refer to:

- Francis M. Pottenger Jr. (1901–1967), American physician and raw food diet advocate
- Francis M. Pottenger Sr. (1869–1961), his father, American physician and tuberculosis researcher
