= Weston A. Price Foundation =

Organization

- Founded: 1999
- Founder: Sally Fallon; Mary G. Enig, PhD
- Type: Nonprofit
- Purpose: Nutrition education
- Location: Washington, D.C.
- Members: c. 13,000
- Revenue: $1,555,781 (2015)
- Expenses: $1,707,156 (2015)
- Website: westonaprice.org

The Weston A. Price Foundation (WAPF), co-founded in 1999 by Sally Fallon (Morell) and nutritionist Mary G. Enig, is a U.S. 501(c)(3) nonprofit organization dedicated to "restoring nutrient-dense foods to the American diet through education, research and activism".

The foundation has been criticized for spreading medical misinformation and dangerous health advice. The U.S. Food and Drug Administration (FDA) has warned about its advocacy of drinking raw milk and various nutritionists, including Joel Fuhrman, were concerned about its advocacy of the health benefits of animal-based fats.

== Weston A. Price ==
Price was a dentist from Cleveland, Ohio, whose 1939 book, Nutrition and Physical Degeneration, describes the fieldwork he did in the 1920s and 1930s among various world cultures, with the original goal of recording and studying the dental health and development of pre-industrial populations.

== Organization ==
The president of the foundation is Sally Fallon Morell. According to the WAPF, she received a B.A. in English from Stanford University and an M.A. in English from UCLA.

The foundation has seven board members and numerous honorary board members, most of whom have medical or nutritional qualifications. In 2010, its membership numbered 13,000 and was growing at an annual rate of 10%, according to The Washington Post.

Its main sources of support are the dues and contributions of its members. It does not receive funding from the government or the food processing and agribusiness industries. It does accept sponsorships, exhibitors and advertising from small companies by invitation, whose products are in line with its principles. The sponsors include grass-fed meat and wild fish producers, as well as health product companies.

A 2004 report published by the foundation stated that it is dedicated to "restoring nutrient-dense foods to the American diet through education, research and activism", and "supports a number of movements that contribute to this objective including accurate nutrition instruction, organic and biodynamic farming, pasture feeding of livestock, community-supported farms, honest and informative labeling, prepared parenting and nurturing therapies."

Specific goals include establishment of universal access to certified raw milk and a ban on the use of soy in infant formulas. The organization actively lobbies in Washington, D.C., on issues such as government dietary guidelines and school lunch programs.

== Dietary recommendations ==
The foundation's recommendations include the consumption of unprocessed or minimally processed foods including: traditional fats (olive oil, cod liver oil, and animal fats such as lard and tallow, etc.), organic fruits and vegetables, raw dairy products, soured or lacto-fermented dairy and vegetables (such as sauerkraut), whole grains (soaked or soured to neutralize their phytic acid, lectins, and other anti-nutrients), and bone stocks.

WAPF publications regularly speak out against marijuana/cannabis and other drugs as harmful and addictive.

=== Lipid hypothesis ===
The Weston A. Price Foundation is known for its controversial position against the lipid hypothesis, maintaining a positive stance towards the consumption of saturated fats and cholesterol from traditional foods.

=== Criticism ===
The anti-vegetarian and anti-soy views of the foundation have been criticized as "myths" in several publications, for example, Quackwatch describes the foundation as promoting "questionable dietary strategies" and Price's core assumptions as contrary to contemporary medical understanding, and Science-Based Medicine evaluated the medical and nutritional claims of the Weston A. Price Foundation and concludes the website is "one of the worst on the internet" due to misleading and false information.

Similarly, John Robbins reviewed the history of the Weston A. Price Foundation and provided evidence that Weston A. Price recommended a vegetarian and dairy diet to his own family members.

Joel Fuhrman has written a series of articles entitled "The truth about the Weston Price foundation" in which he argues the foundation is a purveyor of "nutritional myths", largely because they have failed to update their recommendations in light of contradictory evidence and criticizes advocacy of the health benefits of animal-based fats.

Mark and Chris Hoofnagle of ScienceBlogs coined the term "Crank Magnetism" in a 2007 article about the foundation. The term describes the tendency for purveyors of science denialism and conspiracy theories to buy into many incorrect claims, even when they contradict each other. The foundation promotes many pseudoscientific beliefs including: drinking raw milk to help with diabetes, using magnets to treat stroke victims, root canals block the flow of qi through dental meridians, homeopathic remedies, anti-vaccination practices, and that "sunlight is the best thing for melanoma".

== Activism ==
The Weston A. Price Foundation is a lobbying group that seeks to ban infant soy formula and advocates a nutrient-dense diet of whole foods, including animal fats. Board of Directors member Kaayla Daniel has released a book titled: The Whole Soy Story: The Dark Side of America's Favorite Health Food.

The foundation is an advocate for the consumption of unpasteurized milk, or raw milk, in what is known as the United States raw milk debate. One of its goals is to remove health regulations requiring pasteurization of milk products, so that raw milk can be legally purchased in all states. Supporters of this campaign believe pasteurization removes or destroys beneficial parts of raw milk, leading to a less healthy product that is associated with numerous diseases, however, the U.S. Centers for Disease Control and Food and Drug Administration disagree with this, noting that the pasteurization process "does not significantly change the nutritional value of milk" and that consumption of raw milk poses a "severe health risk". They point out that prior to the widespread use of pasteurization many diseases were commonly transmitted by raw milk, while by 2005 they made up less than 1% of food and water contamination disease outbreaks. The director of the U.S. Food and Drug Administration Division of Plant- and Dairy-Food Safety, John Sheehan, called the organization's claims on the health benefits and safety of raw milk "false, devoid of scientific support, and misleading to consumers".

The organization also supports local food and farms. Established with the help of the foundation in July 2007, the Farm-to-Consumer Legal Defense Fund aims to protect the rights of farmers to provide meat, eggs, raw dairy products, vegetables and other foods directly to consumers. This includes protecting consumers' "freedom of choice to consume raw milk," according to Pete Kennedy, president of the Fund. In the first year of its operation, it raised over $350,000 and receives around three requests for assistance per week from farmers in the United States facing legal or bureaucratic challenges in relation to sales of raw milk.

The Weston A. Price Foundation, by way of founder Sally Fallon and regular contributor Andrew Kaufman, has published articles in its house journal Wise Traditions that call into question established science about COVID-19, specifically that it is a virus at all, that vaccines are beneficial if not outright deadly, and theories about origins in 5G network radiation.

== See also ==
- Price-Pottenger Nutrition Foundation
- Thomas Cowan (Member of the Board of Directors of the foundation)
- Food sovereignty
- Holistic dentistry
