= Francis M. Pottenger Jr. =

American physician and writer

- Born: May 29, 1901; Monrovia, California
- Died: January 4, 1967 (aged 65); Los Angeles County, California
- Occupations: Physician, writer

Francis Marion Pottenger Jr. (May 29, 1901 – January 4, 1967) was an American physician and raw food diet advocate. He was best known for his cat study that sparked interest in a diet high in raw animal products including uncooked meats and unpasteurized dairy. Pottenger was a disciple of Canadian dentist and diet food advocate Weston A. Price. The Price-Pottenger Nutrition Foundation is named after Price and Pottenger.

== Biography ==
Pottenger was born Francis Marion Pottenger Jr. in Monrovia, California, on May 29, 1901. He was the son of Francis M. Pottenger Sr., the physician who founded the Pottenger Sanatorium and Clinic for Diseases of the Chest for treatment of tuberculosis in Monrovia, California. Pottenger was educated at Otterbein University. He married Elizabeth Saxour on June 17, 1925. They had four children.

In 1930, Pottenger obtained his M.D. from the University of Cincinnati College of Medicine. He completed his residency at Los Angeles County Hospital in 1930 and became a full-time assistant at the sanatorium. From 1932 to 1942, he also conducted what became known as the Pottenger Cat Study.

In 1940, he bought some of the cottages from the Monrovia sanatorium and founded the Francis M Pottenger Jr. Hospital. Until closing in 1960, the 42-bed hospital specialized in treating non-tubercular diseases of the lung, especially asthma. At his hospital, he served liberal amounts of liver, butter, cream and eggs to convalescing patients.

== Pottenger's cats ==
Pottenger used donated laboratory cats to test the potency of the adrenal extract hormones he was making. The adrenal glands of these cats were removed for the experiments. He was feeding the cats a diet consisting of raw milk, cod liver oil and cooked meat scraps. When the number of donated cats exceeded the supply of food available, Pottenger began ordering raw meat scraps from a local meat packing plant, including organs, meat, and bone; and fed a separate group of cats from this supply. Within months this separate group appeared in better health than the cooked meat group. Their kittens were more energetic and their post-operative death rate was lower. The results interested Pottenger and he decided to conduct a series of feeding experiments. The experiments involved approximately 900 cats over a period of 10 years, with four generations of cats being studied. Pottenger kept records for 600 cats, but 300 were not recorded.

One group of cats was fed a diet of two-thirds raw meat, one-third raw milk, and cod-liver oil while the second group was fed a diet of two-thirds cooked meat, one-third raw milk, and cod-liver oil. In 1946, Pottenger reported his results that the cats fed the raw diet were healthy while the cats fed the cooked meat diet developed various health problems. Pottenger reported that the cats which were fed cooked meat and pasteurized milk suffered from impaired growth, increased birth defects and lowered fertility. He stated that their deterioration included "germ plasm injury" causing them to pass acquired anatomical defects to their offspring. However, the idea of acquired characteristics being inheritable has been discredited.

In 1985, Pottenger's results were criticized for "lacking scientific validity". William T. Jarvis and Edward Kravitz commented that Pottenger's study was "overloaded with subjective observations and generalizations that render it unscientific. His overall inference that cooking meat made it unhealthful for cats is contradicted by the fact that all commercial cat foods are cooked."

At the time of Pottenger's studies the amino acid taurine had been discovered but had not yet been identified as an essential amino acid for cats. Today many cats thrive on a cooked meat diet where taurine has been added after cooking. The deficient diets lacked sufficient taurine to allow the cats to properly form protein structures and resulted in the health effects observed. Pottenger himself concluded that there was likely an "as yet unidentified, heat‐labile protein factor". In 2014, Robert Davidson wrote that the "deficiencies Pottenger identified in cats correspond with those of a taurine deficiency and are the direct result of the lack of taurine in the feline diet".

The ethics of Pottenger's studies have been questioned.

== Selected publications ==
- The effect of heat-processed foods and metabolized vitamin D milk on the dentofacial structures of experimental animals, 1946
- Fundamentals of Chemistry in the Laboratory, 1976 ISBN 0-673-07877-9
- Pottenger's Cats: A Study in Nutrition, 1983 ISBN 0-916764-06-0

== See also ==
- Hal Huggins
- Melvin E. Page
