= Helyn Luechauer =

Helyn Catherine Luechauer (August 13, 1921 – September 24, 2016) was a prominent dentist practicing in California who was recognized for her pioneering work in the field of holistic dentistry and was the first woman to serve on the Board of Dental Examiners at the California Department of Consumer Affairs.

== Early career ==
In 1942, Luechauer (née Helyn Anderson) became a Wilda the Welder in the Henry J. Kaiser shipyards in Richmond, California, supporting the WWII efforts. After meeting and marrying the foreman, Jarvis Luechauer, she encouraged him to go into dentistry and supported her husband while he went to school. When he opened his dental practice, she took her turn. Now in her 40s, she enrolled in dental school at the University of California San Francisco, a field still new to women. In an interview in the Los Angeles Times, she said she was one of only 50 women in dental school at the time. Upon her graduation, in the top 10% of her class, they opened a joint dental practice in Hollywood, California and were in practice together 35 years.

== Later career ==
In 1974, following surgery for cancer and her personal experiments in wellness, Luechauer returned to school for a master's degree in Nutritional Biochemistry. Her/their dental practice became a holistic practice, with Helyn Luechauer providing nutritional counseling and body chemistry services to their dental patients. Luechauer began to lecture to professionals on the new field and its application to dentistry. While her husband focused on the mechanical aspect of the practice, she was receiving accolades and recognition for her work. In 1978, she was a founding member of the Holistic Dental Association, offering support to individuals as well as the continuing education of dental practitioners. She was also an Honorary Member of the American Society of American Dentists and participated in their annual meetings each year.

== Honors ==
- In 1977, appointed to the California Department of Consumer Affairs' Board of Dental Examiners, the first woman in its 90-year history.
- In 1977, voted Best Dental Instructor of the Year by students at UCLA School of Dentistry.
- In 1991, received the Lucy Hobbs Taylor Award, the highest honor of the American Association of Women Dentists (AAWD) recognizing her commitment, dedication and support to and for patients and peers.
- In 2016, honored as a member of the Half Century Club by University of California San Francisco School of Dentistry for her more than 50 years as a dental professional.
