= Raw milk movement in the United States =

Raw milk sign in Georgia, United States

The raw milk movement in the United States encompasses advocacy and activism for the consumption of raw milk (unpasteurized and unhomogenized) over pasteurized milk.

Raw milk makes up a small proportion of the milk consumption of the American general population. However, some claim the demand for raw milk has "considerably increased in recent years". Raw milk advocates falsely claim a variety of health benefits attributable to untreated dairy products; government officials and scientific researchers stress that there are substantial food safety risks associated with raw milk, and that claims of health benefits provided by raw milk are unsupported by scientific evidence.

== Homogenization ==
Unprocessed milk consists of globules of milk fat suspended in a watery base containing dissolved proteins, sugars, vitamins, and minerals. If the globules are large enough, as with unprocessed milk from cows, the fat globules float upwards until they form a distinct cream layer at the top. Some animals, such as goats, produce smaller fat globules that remain mixed unless mechanically separated by centrifugation.

Homogenization is a process that reduces the size of fat globules by forcing pressurized, hot milk through small holes, causing turbulence that breaks up the larger fat globules so that they remain suspended rather than separating in a cream layer at the top. The purpose of homogenization is to make milk more convenient to process, store and consume, eliminating the need to shake or stir the milk container to remix the separated cream layer and increasing the shelf-life of the product.

Those opposed to homogenization argue that decreasing the size of fat globules may have unhealthy effects, including allowing steroid and protein hormones to bypass normal digestion and increase their levels in the body. Concerns that uptake of the protein xanthine oxidase is increased by homogenization, leading to hardening of the arteries (atherosclerosis), were raised in the 1970s. Subsequent research "failed to substantiate, and in many cases has refuted" a plausible effect of xanthine oxidase from homogenized milk on cardiovascular disease.

Scientific studies are somewhat limited but do not currently support claims that milk homogenization affects the development of atherosclerosis, coronary heart disease, milk allergy and milk intolerance, Type I diabetes or Type II diabetes.

== Pasteurization ==
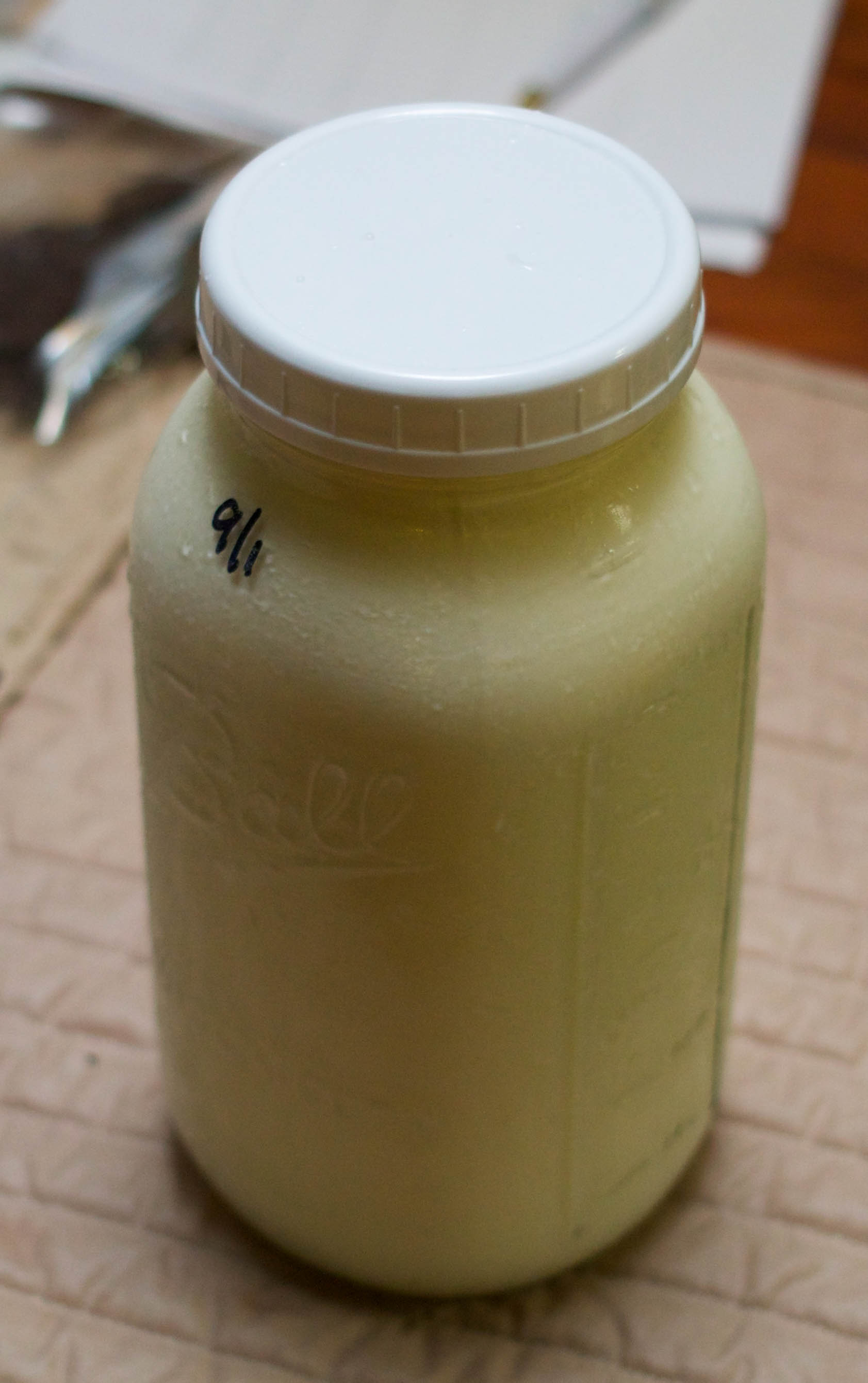
American raw milk

Pasteurization is a sanitation process in which milk is heated briefly to a temperature high enough to kill pathogens, followed by rapid cooling. While different times and temperatures may be used by different processors, pasteurization is most commonly achieved with heating to 161 degrees Fahrenheit (71.7 degrees Celsius) for 15 seconds. Milk is tested following pasteurization to confirm that bacteria have been killed to an acceptable level. Pasteurization kills pathogenic bacteria which occasionally may be present in milk, including those causing tuberculosis (Mycobacterium bovis), listeriosis (Listeria monocytogenes), Q fever (Coxiella burnetii), brucellosis (Brucella), campylobacteriosis (Campylobacter), salmonellosis (Salmonella), and several other foodborne illnesses (e.g., Escherichia coli O157:H7). Pasteurization may not kill some resistant bacteria, which can eventually cause souring and spoilage of fresh milk. UHT pasteurization (Ultra High Temperature) is a more extreme form of pasteurization heating milk to a temperature high enough to kill spoilage organisms also.

Pasteurization is widely accepted to improve the safety of milk products by reducing the exposure to pathogens. Opponents of pasteurization argue that raw milk has benefits associated with superior taste, nutritional qualities and certain health benefits over pasteurized milk. A 2009 systematic review of the food safety of raw milk concluded that science-based data to substantiate claims of health benefits "are lacking or do not exist" and the risks associated with disease outbreaks as a result of raw milk consumption are "considerably higher".

=== History ===
Pasteurization was first used in the United States in the 1890s after the discovery of germ theory to control the hazards of highly contagious bacterial diseases, including bovine tuberculosis and brucellosis, that could be easily transmitted to humans through the drinking of raw milk. In addition, milk at the time was a big component of infant diets, meaning contaminated milk contributed notably to infant mortality rates. Initially after the scientific discovery of bacteria, no product testing was available to determine if a farmer's milk was safe or infected, so all milk had to be treated as potentially contagious. After the first test was developed, some farmers actively worked to prevent their infected animals from being killed and removed from food production, or would falsify the test results so that their animals would appear to be free of infection. Some milk producers also add additives or dilute their milk to mask contamination.

Chicago became the first American city with a mandatory milk pasteurization law in 1909. New York city followed with similar laws in 1914. Within a decade after New York city started enforcing milk pasteurization, infant mortality fell by more than two thirds.

In the United States, milk pasteurization became "widespread" in the 1920s and it was considered "one of the major breakthroughs in public health". In 1924, "Grade A Pasteurization" became recommended federal policy, but interstate commerce of unpasteurized dairy products was only limited via federal legislation in 1987.

=== Legal status of unpasteurized milk ===
Legality of raw milk per state: Legal through retail sales Legal through farm sales Legal through herdshares Legal for animal consumption Legal for goat's milk only Legal through doctor's approval Legal through State Commission Illegal

In 2009, 29 U.S. states allowed sales of raw milk in some form. In other parts of the world, raw milk can often be bought directly from the farmer. Arizona, Utah, California and Washington allow raw milk sales in retail stores with appropriate warning labeling. As of May 2010, Massachusetts only allowed direct sales from farm to consumer, resulting in "buying clubs" where consumers pool transportation resources to obtain raw milk more conveniently. In April 2013, the state of North Dakota passed a law that authorizes the use of herd shares.

In late 2007, raw milk received media attention in California, where limits on the bacterial counts legally allowed in commercial raw milk came up for legislative review. Reuters named raw milk as first on a list of the top eight health issues of 2008. The FDA has also offered financial assistance to state departments of health to help reduce raw milk consumption.

=== Health effects of unpasteurized milk ===
Pasteurization is credited with dramatically reducing pathogens found in milk. This improves the shelf-life and safety of the processed milk. Advocates of drinking raw milk claim various health benefits they attribute to raw milk that are lost in the pasteurization process, and claim that raw milk can be produced as hygienically as pasteurized milk. Raw milk advocates may go as far as to claim that untreated milk is a "miracle cure" for illnesses such as asthma or gastrointestinal disorders. A 2006 systematic review of infections associated with raw milk contends that pasteurized milk is both substantially safer and comparably nutritious to raw milk, concluding there is no scientific reason for choosing raw milk products over pasteurized milk products. Similarly, a recent review authored by the Belgian Federal Agency for the Safety of the Food Chain and experts from Belgian universities and institutions concluded that "raw milk poses a realistic health threat due to a possible contamination with human pathogens. It is therefore strongly recommended that milk should be heated before consumption. With the exception of an altered organoleptic [flavor] profile, heating (in particularly ultra high temperature and similar treatments) will not substantially change the nutritional value of raw milk or other benefits associated with raw milk consumption."

Pasteurization opponents say that raw milk contains bacteria beneficial to the human digestive system, but pasteurization is not selective and affects all bacteria whether beneficial or infectious. These bacteria include species considered to be probiotics, such as Lactobacillus acidophilus, useful for the culturing of yogurt and cheese. Fermented milk products with levels of L. acidophilus significantly higher than those found in raw milk have been associated with decreased incidence of pediatric diarrhea, decreased levels of toxic amines in the blood of dialysis patients with small bowel bacterial overgrowth, aided lactose digestion in lactose-intolerant subjects, and a reduction in coronary heart disease risks. However, food scientists and FDA officials maintain that such "good bacteria" can be found in pasteurized products, including yogurt, and argue that the destruction of pathogens far outweighs any proposed benefit to keeping the beneficial microbes alive.

==== Pathogens and public health concerns ====
According to a 2009 review, milkborne disease outbreaks made up approximately 25% of all food and water contamination disease outbreaks in 1938; pasteurization is largely credited for a dramatic decrease in milkborne disease outbreaks, which made up less than 1% of food and water contamination disease outbreaks by 2005.

According to the Centers for Disease Control and Prevention (CDC), more than 300 people in the United States got sick from drinking raw milk or eating cheese made from raw milk in 2001, and nearly 200 became ill from these products in 2002. "Drinking raw milk or eating raw milk products is like playing Russian roulette with your health," says John Sheehan, director of the Food and Drug Administration's Division of Dairy and Egg Safety. "We see a number of cases of food-borne illness every year related to the consumption of raw milk."

In 2006, the California Department of Food and Agriculture temporarily quarantined milk and cream from Organic Pastures, California's largest raw milk producer, after four children were stricken with E. coli O157:H7 bacterial illness. The department determined that the common link in all four cases "was consumption of raw milk or raw colostrum from Organic Pastures in the week prior to symptom onset."

Milk collected or stored in unsanitary conditions may harbor a host of disease-causing organisms (pathogens), such as tuberculosis (Mycobacterium bovis), the bacteria Campylobacter (Campylobacteriosis), Escherichia E. coli O157:H7), Listeria (Listeriosis), Salmonella (Salmonellosis), Yersinia (Yersinia enterocolitica), and Brucella (Brucellosis). Pasteurization consistently removes all of these pathogens, allowing dairy farms that pasteurize their milk to have unsanitary facilities without the attendant outbreaks of disease that would occur if a raw milk dairy kept its herds in similar unsanitary conditions. The pathogens can be reintroduced if the milk is handled carelessly.

People with weakened immune systems, such as elderly, children, and those with certain diseases or conditions, are most at risk for severe infections from pathogens that can contaminate raw milk. In pregnant women, Listeria monocytogenes-caused illness can result in miscarriage, fetal death, or illness or death of a newborn infant, and Escherichia coli (E. coli) infection has been linked to hemolytic uremic syndrome, a condition that can cause kidney failure and death. Other groups, such as the Center for Food Safety and Applied Nutrition and American Academy of Pediatrics, also warn that raw milk is dangerous, especially for children.

The CDC cites numerous cases of serious or fatal infections caused by raw milk, with E. coli O157:H7 being the most important because it can cause hemolytic-uremic syndrome, a life-threatening condition. In a CDC report, numerous cases were traced to raw milk from a cow-share program in Cowlitz County, Washington. After five children were hospitalized, a court order was issued to bring the farm into compliance. In 2007, Kansas State University published a list of outbreaks associated with consuming raw milk or dairy products and an article about the investigation of raw milk outbreaks.

The Weston A. Price Foundation has been active in promoting raw milk with its "Real Milk" campaign. The organization claims that of 15 milk-borne disease outbreaks cited by the FDA, not a single one demonstrated that pasteurization would have fixed the problem, that 93% lacked either a valid statistical correlation with raw milk or a positive sample, and half lacked both; they further claimed that, even with the FDA's numbers, raw milk was no more dangerous than deli meats. In response, the director of the FDA's division of plant- and dairy-food safety, John Sheehan, called the organization's claims on the health benefits and safety of raw milk "false, devoid of scientific support, and misleading to consumers".

In 2008, scientists discovered that raw milk contains more species of bacteria than previously thought, and identified Chryseobacterium oranimense as well as C. haifense and C. bovis, but the amount found in raw milk has not been proven harmful.

While causation has not been determined, researchers in 2015 found that 59% of people with breast cancer had bovine leukemia virus (BLV) in their breast cancer samples, compared to the virus being found in only 29% of tissue samples of people who had never had breast cancer. BLV is common, spread by blood and milk in cows, and has been found in 100% of bulk milk tanks in dairy operations with over 500 cows. Consuming unpasteurized milk or undercooked meats could be pathways for human exposure to BLV.

In November 2017, the US Centers for Disease Control and Prevention recommended medical treatment for anyone who had within the previous six months consumed raw milk products from Udder Milk, a New Jersey–based cooperative. An antibiotic-resistant strain of Brucella abortus, which can cause the disease Brucellosis, was detected in at least one person who drank raw milk from the co-op.

==== Nutrients in milk ====
Advocates of drinking raw milk claim raw milk contains desirable substances, such as enzymes, that cannot survive the heating process and may be destroyed during pasteurization; specifically, immunoglobulins and the enzymes lipase and phosphatase, which are inactivated by heat, are believed to be beneficial. In contrast, food scientists and FDA officials assert that most "beneficial" enzymes survive pasteurization; that those few enzymes that are present in raw milk and denatured in pasteurized milk are ultimately degraded in the low pH environment of the stomach anyway; and that the enzymes present in milk are not used by humans to metabolize nutrients.

Pasteurization does lead to decreased levels of several vitamins, but only approximately 0–10%. Research shows only very slight differences in the nutritional values of pasteurized and unpasteurized milk. Raw milk contains very little vitamin D, which is added to processed milk.

==== Protection against non-infectious disease ====
Three studies have found a statistically significant inverse relationship between consumption of raw milk and asthma and allergies. However, all of these studies have been performed in children living on farms and living a farming lifestyle, rather than comparing urban children living typical urban lifestyles and with typical urban exposures who do or do not consume raw milk, so it is likely that other aspects of the overall urban vs. farming environment lifestyle play a role in these effects; for this reason, the overall phenomenon is termed the "farm effect." In the largest of these studies, exposure to cows and straw as well as raw milk were associated with lower rates of asthma, and exposure to animal feed storage rooms and manure with lower rates of atopic dermatitis. A recent scientific review concluded that “most studies alluding to a possible protective effect of raw milk consumption do not contain any objective confirmation on the raw milk status or a direct comparison with heat-treated milk. Moreover, it seems that the observed increased resistance seems to be rather related to the exposure to a farm environment or to animals than to raw milk consumption.”

=== Sensory experiences of pasteurized and un-pasteurized products ===
Many raw milk consumers cite a preference for the taste of raw milk products.

The Raw Milk Cheesemakers Association hold that cheese produced from raw milk have distinctive complexity and depth of flavor absent from pasteurized-milk cheeses.

The FDA considers hard, aged cheese, such as parmesan and cheddar, made from raw milk to be generally safe for consumption; soft cheese made from raw milk is considered unsafe. These types of cheese are currently legally sold if aged for 60 days or more. Over this period, the salt and acid characteristics of aging cheese generally eliminate the growth of pathogenic bacteria.

== Personal choice ==
Raw milk advocates cite libertarian and personal choice arguments against government interference concerning the sale of raw milk. Some advocates feel resentment towards the government's efforts in limiting the distribution and consumption of raw milk, seeing their actions as a personal choice that is not harmful to anyone else. Raw milk activism is often associated with alternative medicine and anti-regulatory activism.

== Quality standards for milk ==
The methods of determining Grade A milk quality are well-established and outlined in the FDA Grade A Pasteurized Milk Ordinance. These grades are typically related to a measurement known as the somatic cell count (SCC) and the bacteria plate count. Generally a lower somatic cell count indicates better animal health, while the bacteria plate count indicates improved equipment sanitation.

Somatic cells originate only from inside the animal's udder, while bacteria are usually from external contamination, such as insufficient cleaning of the milk transport equipment or insufficient external cleansing of the cow's udder and teats prior to milking. Milking equipment can also be accidentally knocked or kicked off an animal onto the floor, and contaminants on the barn floor can be sucked into the milk line by the system vacuum. A filter sock or filter disk in the pipeline prevents large particulate contaminants from entering the milk bulk tank, but cannot remove bacterial contamination once it has occurred.

For example, as defined by the state of Indiana’s administrative code, Grade A milk shall meet the following standards:

- The bacterial estimate classification shall be "acceptable".
- The bacteria count using the standard plate count, direct microscopic count, or plate loop count methods shall be not more than one million (1,000,000) Colony-forming units (cfu) of bacteria per milliliter.
- The somatic cell count shall be not more than one million (1,000,000) cfu cells per milliliter.
- The milk shall not contain drug residues.

Milk not meeting these standards shall be designated as undergrade. Undergrade milk may not be sold for human consumption or processing into products for human consumption.

As established, these measurements are taken daily from the milk bulk tank and not from individual cows. This is because testing of individual animals at each milking would be expensive, but it also means that milk from a sick cow is diluted and averaged down by the healthy animals. Greater bulk tanks at very great commercial farms are accommodating of more sick animals in the herd, without the sick animals affecting the overall milk quality rating.

As discussed in the paper Guidelines for Using the DHI Somatic Cell Count Program

- The results of many studies suggest that cows with SCC of less than 200,000 are not likely to be infected with major mastitis pathogens, but cows with SCC above 300,000 are probably infected (Smith, 1996).
- Herds with bulk tank SCC above 200,000 will have varying degrees of subclinical mastitis present. Data from the National Mastitis Council (1987) show that 6% of the [udder] quarters in a herd could be expected to be infected in a herd with a bulk tank SCC of 200,000.
- At 500,000 SCC, 16% of the quarters may be infected with a 6% reduction in milk production compared to a SCC of 200,000.

Bacteria in milk can come from sources other than the animal. Over time the milking pipeline and equipment can become coated with residues such as milkstone which are not removed by standard detergents and require periodic flushing of equipment with high strength corrosives. Automatic washing equipment for the bulk tank may not effectively clean all interior surfaces, and does not clean the exterior of the bulk tank at all.

Most milk marketers award producers for having a low SCC milk. Producers are incentivized to produce low SCC milk through the federal marketing order SCC adjustment rate. Milk marketers with a large presence in the cheese manufacturing may offer additional premiums for low SCC milk, as there is an increase in cheese yield.

== See also ==
- Dairy industry in the United States
- Food politics
- Food safety in the United States
- Swill milk scandal
