= Mary G. Enig =

American nutritionist (1931–2014)

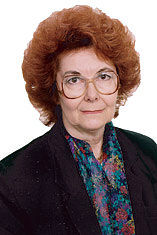
- Born: Mary Gertrude Dracon; July 13, 1931; Indianapolis, Indiana
- Died: September 8, 2014 (aged 83)
- Education: University of Maryland, College Park
- Awards: Master of the American College of Nutrition
- Scientific career
- Fields: Nutrition
- Workplaces: Weston A. Price Foundation

Mary Gertrude Enig (née Dracon; July 13, 1931 – September 8, 2014) was a nutritionist and researcher known for her unconventional positions on the role saturated fats play in diet and health. She disputed the medical consensus that diets high in saturated fats contribute to development of heart disease, while she advocated for a low-carbohydrate high-fat diet, rich in animal fats and coconut oil.

Along with Sally Fallon, Enig co-founded the Weston A. Price Foundation (WAPF) in 1999. Enig died of a stroke at the age of 83.

== Career ==
Enig attended the University of Maryland, College Park (UMD) where she received a MS and later a PhD in Nutritional Sciences in 1984. From 1984 through 1991 she was a faculty research associate at UMD with the Lipids Research Group in the Department of Chemistry and Biochemistry where she participated in biochemical research on lipids.

Enig was a Licensed Nutritionist in Maryland from May 1988 to October 2008. She was a Master of the American College of Nutrition. and was a former editor of the Journal of the American College of Nutrition where she published articles on food fats and oils.

Enig was a board member and vice-president of the Weston A. Price Foundation (WAPF) which she co-founded with Sally Fallon in 1999 to promote nutrition and health advice based on the work of early 20th century dentist and researcher Weston A. Price.

== Dietary views ==
Enig, a member of The International Network of Cholesterol Skeptics (THINCS), disputed the widely accepted view in the scientific community that consumption of saturated fats contributes to heart disease. Her chapter in the book Coronary Heart Disease: The Dietary Sense and Nonsense – An evaluation by scientists was reviewed in the New England Journal of Medicine, which noted that while she provided an appropriate discussion of trans fats in diet, she did not accurately depict the medical literature on the connection between diet and coronary disease, and that she wrote with an inflammatory tone that was unjustified. Enig responded in a letter published in the journal.

Enig criticized vegetarianism and low-fat diets. She argued against medical consensus by stating, "heart disease has been correlated most consistently with consumption of sugar and an excess in polyunsaturated oils". She denied studies linking heart disease to red meat consumption. She opposed the use of processed foods such as pasteurized milk, sugar, vegetables oils and white flour.

Enig claimed butter and coconut oil are good for heart health. She published articles on the properties of coconut oil and was a vocal advocate for its consumption. Citing the work of Jon J. Kabara, she claimed that unprocessed coconut oil could be effective in the treatment of viral infections including HIV/AIDS.

Enig was an early researcher of trans fatty acids, warning of their dangers before they were widely accepted. She believed that trans fats lower the beneficial type of cholesterol-carrying particles (HDL) and pushed for improved labeling of trans fats on products, which is now mandatory on food products in the U.S. and in Europe.

In 1989, Sally Fallon, an advocate for the nutritional theories of Weston A. Price, recruited Enig to utilize her nutritional training to co-write a book to promote Price's work, Nourishing Traditions: The Cookbook That Challenges Politically Correct Nutrition and the Diet Dictocrats. It has sold more than 400,000 copies as of 2011.

Enig co-wrote another book with Fallon called Eat Fat, Lose Fat which promotes what Enig considered "good" fats, and argued that many who follow low-fat diets feel low on energy because they are "fat deficient".

== Selected publications ==
- Nourishing Traditions: The Cookbook that Challenges Politically Correct Nutrition and the Diet Dictocrats (1999, with Sally Fallon)
- Eat Fat, Lose Fat: Lose Weight and Feel Great with Three Delicious, Science-Based Coconut Diets (2004, with Sally Fallon) ISBN 978-1-59463-005-7
