= Dental amalgam controversy =

Debate about the effectiveness and safety of dental amalgam

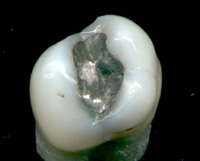
Premolar tooth with amalgam filling

The dental amalgam controversy is the debate over whether dental amalgam (the mercury alloy in dental fillings) should be used. Supporters claim that it is safe, effective and long-lasting, while critics argue that amalgam is unsafe because it may cause mercury poisoning and other toxicity.

Supporters of amalgam fillings point out that dental amalgalm is safe, durable, relatively inexpensive, and easy to use. On average, amalgam lasts twice as long as resin composites, takes less time to place, is tolerant of saliva or blood contamination during placement (unlike composites), and is often about 20–30% less expensive. Consumer Reports has suggested that many who claim dental amalgam is not safe are "prospecting for disease" and using pseudoscience to scare patients into more lucrative treatment options.

Those opposed to amalgam use suggest that modern composites are improving in strength. In addition to their claims of possible health and ethical issues, opponents of dental amalgam fillings claim amalgam fillings contribute to mercury contamination of the environment. The World Health Organization (WHO) reports that health care facilities, including dental offices, account for as much as 5% of total wastewater mercury emissions. The WHO also points out that amalgam separators, installed in the waste water lines of many dental offices, dramatically decrease the release of mercury into the public sewer system. In the United States, most dental practices are prohibited from disposing amalgam waste down the drain. Critics also point to cremation of dental fillings as an additional source of air pollution, contributing about 1% of global emissions.

The World Health Organization recommends a global phase out of dental mercury in their 2009 report on "Future Use of Materials For Dental Restorations, based on aiming for a general reduction of the use of mercury in all sectors, and based on the environmental impacts of mercury product production."

It is the position of the FDI World Dental Federation as well as numerous dental associations and dental public health agencies worldwide that amalgam restorations are safe and effective. Numerous other organizations have also publicly declared the safety and effectiveness of amalgam. These include the Mayo Clinic, Health Canada, Alzheimer's Association, American Academy of Pediatrics, Autism Society of America, U.S. Environmental Protection Agency (EPA), National Multiple Sclerosis Society, New England Journal of Medicine, International Journal of Dentistry, National Council Against Health Fraud, The National Institute of Dental and Craniofacial Research NIDCR, American Cancer Society, Lupus Foundation of America, the American College of Medical Toxicology, the American Academy of Clinical Toxicology, Consumer Reports Prevention, WebMD and the International Association for Dental Research.

The U.S. Food and Drug Administration (FDA) formerly stated that amalgam is "safe for adults and children ages 6 and above" but now recommends against amalgam for children, pregnant/nursing women, and other high-risk groups.

== History ==
Dental amalgam has had a long history and global impact. It was first introduced in the Chinese materia medica of Su Kung in 659 A.D. during the Tang dynasty. In Europe, Johannes Stockerus, a municipal physician in Ulm, Germany, recommended amalgam as a filling material as early as 1528. In 1818, Parisian physician Louis Nicolas Regnart added one-tenth by weight of mercury to the fusable metals used as fillings at the time to create a temporarily soft metal alloy at room temperature. Thus, amalgam (an alloy of mercury with another metal or metals, from the French word amalgame) was invented. This was further perfected in 1826, when Auguste Taveau of Paris used a silver paste made from mixing French silver-tin coins with mercury, which offered more plasticity and a quicker setting time. In Europe, before 1818, carious teeth were either filled with a melted metal, usually gold or silver (which would often lead to death of the nerve of the tooth from thermal trauma), or the tooth would be extracted.

=== Further developments ===
In 1855, Dr. J. Foster Flagg, a professor of dental pathology in Philadelphia, experimented with new mixtures of amalgam. In 1861, he presented his findings to the Pennsylvania Association of Dental Surgeons and, in 1881, he published his book, Plastic and Plastic Fillings. (Amalgam fillings were often called "plastic fillings" at the time.) The inevitable result of this affair was that silver amalgam was proven to be "an excellent filling material", and expanded dentistry's "ability to save teeth". Around the same time, John and Charles Tomes in England conducted research on the expansion and contraction of the various amalgam products. During the American Civil War, the debate on the merits of amalgam continued. In dental meetings, with now decades of use and dental research came the recognition of the importance of good technique and proper mixture on long-term success. It was argued, "the fault was not in the material but in the manipulation.... Some men's amalgam is good universally, and some men's gold is bad universally; the difference lies in the preparation of the tooth and in the plug (filling)."

More controversy came in 1872, when an amalgam filling was reported as the cause of death of a Nebraska middle-aged man, resulting in a public outcry against the use of amalgam. His physicians reported that the filling caused swelling of his mouth, throat, and windpipe, completely hindering respiration. Given that the involved tooth was a lower second molar, it was later considered very likely that the patient died from Ludwig's angina, which is a type of cellulitis, rather than mercury poisoning. Another alleged case of "pytalism" causing headache, fever, rapid pulse, metallic taste, loss of appetite, and generalized malaise was reported in 1872 in a female patient following the insertion of eight amalgam fillings. Later, however, another dentist examined the fillings and noted they had, in a short period, washed away, and that upon gentle pressure the metal crumbled away. He removed all the fillings with an explorer in three minutes and concluded poor workmanship alone could have explained the patient's symptoms.

Alfred Stock was a German chemist who reported becoming very ill in the 1920s and traced his illness to his amalgam fillings and resulting mercury intoxication. He described his recovery after the fillings were removed and believed that amalgam fillings would come to be seen as a "sin against humanity". Stock had also previously been exposed to toxic levels of mercury vapor during his work, due to his use of liquid mercury in some novel laboratory apparatus he invented.

=== Galvanic shock ===
Oral galvanism, amalgam disease, or Galvanic shock was a term for the association of oral or systemic symptoms to either: electric currents between metal in dental restorations and electrolytes in saliva or dental pulp. Any existence of galvanic pain or association of either currents or mercury to presence of symptoms has been disproven. Beyond acute allergic reaction amalgam has not been found to be associated with any adverse effects.

Very weak currents have been measured in the mouth of those with multiple dental fillings consisting of different alloys, but there was no association between presence of current and symptoms, and any symptoms associated with currents between oral fillings are likely to be psychosomatic in nature. No association between presence of mercury and symptoms have been found, with symptoms likely to be psychosomatic in nature and do not improve with chelation therapy. Claims of causing a variety of symptoms such as oral discomfort, skin irritation, headaches and a metallic taste in the mouth have been discredited.

The condition was originally proposed in 1878, and became well known in Sweden during the 1970s and 80s, because of a campaign to educate about and replace oral amalgam fillings with mercury with other compounds such as ceramic or polymer restorations.

=== 1990s to present ===
In the 1990s, several governments evaluated the effects of dental amalgam and concluded that the most likely health effects would be due to hypersensitivity or allergy. Germany, Austria, and Canada recommended against placing amalgam in certain individuals, such as pregnant women, children, those with renal dysfunction, and those with an allergy to metals. In 2004, the Life Sciences Research Office analyzed studies related to dental amalgam published after 1996 and concluded that mean urinary mercury concentration (μg of Hg/L in urine, HgU) was the most reliable estimate of mercury exposure. It found that those with dental amalgam were unlikely to reach the levels where adverse effects are seen from occupational exposure (35 μg HgU). Some 95% of study participants had μg HgU below 4–5. Chewing gum, particularly for nicotine, along with more amalgam, seemed to pose the greatest risk of increasing exposure. One gum-chewer had 24.8 μg HgU. Studies have shown that the amount of mercury released during normal chewing is extremely low. It concluded that there was not enough evidence to support or refute many of the other claims such as increased risk of autoimmune disorders, but stated that the broad and nonspecific illness attributed to dental amalgam is not supported by the data. Mutter in Germany, however, concludes, "removal of dental amalgam leads to permanent improvement of various chronic complaints in a relevant number of patients in various trials."

Hal Huggins, a Colorado dentist (previous to having his license revoked), was a notable critic of dental amalgams and other dental therapies he believed to be harmful. His views on amalgam toxicity were featured on 60 Minutes and he was later criticized as a dentist, "prospecting for disease" and having only an "aura of science" by Consumer Reports. In 1996, a Colorado state judge recommended that Huggins's dental license be revoked, for tricking chronically ill patients into thinking that the true cause of their illness was mercury. Time reported the judge's conclusion that Huggins, "diagnosed 'mercury toxicity' in all his patients, including some without amalgam fillings." Huggins's license was subsequently revoked by the Colorado State Board of Dental Examiners for gross negligence and the use of unnecessary and unproven procedures.

== Mercury exposure ==
According to the WHO, all humans are exposed to some level of mercury. Factors that determine whether health effects occur and their severity include the type of mercury concerned (methylmercury and ethylmercury, commonly found in fish, being more serious than elemental mercury); the dose; the age or developmental stage of the person exposed (the foetus is most susceptible); the duration of exposure; and the route of exposure (inhalation, ingestion or dermal contact). The universal standard for examining mercury toxicity is usually discussed in terms of the amount of mercury in the bloodstream for short-term exposure or the amount of mercury excreted in the urine relative to creatine for long-term mercury exposure. Elemental mercury (which is a component of amalgam) is absorbed very differently than methylmercury (which is found in fish). The exposure to mercury from amalgam restorations depends on the number and size of restorations, composition, chewing habits, food texture, grinding, brushing of teeth, and many other physiological factors.

The greatest degree of mercury exposure occurs during filling placement and removal. However, this is not the only time mercury vapors are released. When chewing for extended periods (more than 30 minutes) an increased level of mercury vapor is released. Vapor levels will return to normal approximately 90 minutes following chewing cessation. This contributes to a daily mercury exposure for those with amalgam fillings.

According to one dental textbook, eating seafood once a week raises urine mercury levels to 5 to 20 μg/L, which is equivalent to two to eight times the level of exposure that comes from numerous amalgam fillings. Neither exposure has any known health effect. Scientists agree that dental amalgam fillings release elemental mercury vapor, but studies report different amounts. Estimates range from 1 to 3 micrograms (μg) per day according to the FDA. The effects of that amount of exposure are also disputed.

Newer studies sometimes use mercury vapor analysis instead of the standard exposure test. Because this test was designed for factories and large enclosures, Consumer Reports has reported that this is not an accurate method of analysis for the mouth. It is less reliable, less consistent, and tends to greatly exaggerate the amount of mercury inhaled. Moreover, it is argued that this test additionally exaggerates the amount of mercury inhaled by assuming that all the mercury vapor released is inhaled. This assumption was reviewed by the U.S. Department of Health and Human Services and not found to be valid. Their research review found that most of the mercury vapor released from amalgam fillings is mixed with saliva and swallowed, some part is exhaled, and the remaining fraction is inhaled. Of these amounts, the lungs absorb about 80% of inhaled mercury.

A study conducted by measuring the intraoral vapour levels over 24 hours in patients with at least nine amalgam restorations showed that the average daily dose of inhaled mercury vapour was 1.7 μg (range from 0.4 to 4.4 μg), which is approximately 1% of the threshold limit value of 300 to 500 μg/day established by the WHO, based on a maximum allowable environmental level of 50 μg/day in the workplace. Critics point out that: (1) the workplace safety standards are based on allowable maxima in the workplace, not mercury body burden; (2) the workplace safety numbers do not apply to continuous 24-hour exposure, but are limited to a normal work day and a 40-hour workweek; and (3) the uptake/absorption numbers are averages and not worst-case patients (those most at risk).

A test that was done throughout the 1980s by some opposition groups and holistic dentists was the skin patch test for mercury allergies. As part of "prospecting for disease", Consumer Reports wrote that these groups had placed high doses of mercuric chloride on a skin patch, which was guaranteed to produce irritation on the patient's skin and subsequent revenue for the person administering the test.

The current recommendations for residential exposure (not including amalgam fillings already accounted for) are as follows: The ATSDR Action Level for indoor mercury vapor in residential settings is 1 μg/m^{3} and the ATSDR MRL (Minimal Risk Level) for chronic exposure is 0.2 μg/m^{3} According to the ATSDR, the MRL(Minimal Risk Level) is an estimate of the level of daily exposure to a substance that is unlikely to cause adverse non-cancerous health effects. The Action Level is defined as an indoor air concentration of mercury that would prompt officials to consider implementing response actions. It is a recommendation and does not necessarily imply toxicity or health risks. Breathing air with a concentration of 0.2 μg mercury/m^{3} would lead to an inhaled amount of approximately 4 μg/day (respiratory volume of 20m^{3}/day). About 80% of inhaled mercury vapor would be absorbed.

A 2003 monograph on mercury toxicity from the WHO concluded that dental amalgam contributes significantly to mercury body burden in humans with amalgam fillings and that dental amalgam is the most common form of exposure to elemental mercury in the general population, constituting a potentially significant source of exposure to elemental mercury. Estimates of daily intake from amalgam restorations range from 1 to 12.5 μg/day, with the majority of dental amalgam holders being exposed to less than 5 μg mercury/day. They also note that this will continue to decline as the number of amalgam restorations is declining.

== Health research ==
As public pressure demands more research on amalgam safety, an increasing number of studies with larger sample sizes are being conducted. Those who are not opposed to amalgam claim that, aside from rare and localized tissue irritation, recent evidence-based research has continued to demonstrate no ill effects from the minute amounts of mercury exposure from amalgam fillings. A 2004 systematic review conducted by the Life Sciences Research Office, whose clients include the FDA and NIH, concluded, "the current data are insufficient to support an association between mercury release from dental amalgam and the various complaints that have been attributed to this restoration material." A systematic review in 2009 demonstrated that mercury released from amalgam restorations does not give rise to toxic effects on the nervous system of children. In 2014, a Cochrane Systematic review found "insufficient evidence to support or refute any adverse effects associated with amalgam or composite restorations."

Those opposed to dental amalgam suggest that mercury from dental amalgam may lead to nephrotoxicity, neurobehavioural changes, autoimmunity, oxidative stress, autism, skin and mucosa alterations, non-specific symptoms and complaints, Alzheimer's disease, calcium-building in the kidneys, kidney stones, thyroid issues, and multiple sclerosis.

=== Autoimmune disorders ===
Both those opposed and those not opposed to dental amalgam recognize that amalgam has been found to be a rare contributor to localized and temporary tissue irritation known as oral lichenoid lesions. These mild, lichenoid reactions have also been reported in composite resin fillings. Those opposed to amalgam believe that amalgam fillings are also associated with increased risk of other autoimmune conditions such as multiple sclerosis (MS), lupus, thyroiditis, and eczema.

Consumer Reports considered these alleged associations between amalgam and chronic disease made by some health practitioners as "prospecting for diseases". The National Multiple Sclerosis Society (USA) similarly has stated, "There is no scientific evidence to connect the development or worsening of MS with dental fillings containing mercury, and therefore no reason to have those fillings removed. Although poisoning with heavy metals-such as mercury, lead, or manganese can damage the nervous system and produce symptoms such as tremor and weakness, the damage is inflicted in a different way than occurs in MS and the process is also different." The Lupus Foundation of America also states on their website, "At the present time, we do not have any scientific data that indicates that dental fillings may act as a trigger of lupus. In fact, it is highly unlikely that dental fillings aggravate or cause SLE."

=== Dental staff impact ===
In 2006, a literature review was undertaken to evaluate the research on amalgam and its potential health effects on dentists and dental staff. It was reported that there is currently no conclusive epidemiological evidence regarding risks for adverse reproductive outcomes associated with mercury and dental professionals. It is mentioned that evidence to date fails to account for all confounding variables (such as alcohol consumption) and recommends more comprehensive and rigorous studies to adequately assess the hazards faced by dental personnel.

=== Removal of amalgam ===
The American College of Medical Toxicology and the American Academy of Clinical Toxicology still claim that mercury from amalgams does not cause illness because "the amount of mercury that they release is not enough to cause a health problem". In response to some people wanting their existing amalgam removed for fear of mercury poisoning, these societies advise that the removal of fillings is likely to cause a greater exposure to mercury than leaving the fillings in place. These societies also claim that removal of amalgam fillings, in addition to being unnecessary health care and likely to cause more mercury exposure than leaving them in place, is also expensive.

Dentists who advocate the removal of amalgam fillings often recommend wearing breathing apparatus, using high-volume aspiration, and performing the procedure as quickly as possible. Sources of mercury from the diet, and the potential harm of the composite resins to replace the purportedly harmful amalgam fillings, may also need to be considered.

=== Alternative materials ===
Alternative materials which may be suitable in some situations include composite resins, glass ionomer cements, porcelain, and gold alloys. Most of these materials, with the notable exception of gold, have not been used as long as amalgam, and some are known to contain other potentially hazardous compounds. Teaching of amalgam techniques to dental students is declining in some schools in favor of composite resin, and at least one school, the University of Nijmegen in the Netherlands, eliminated dental amalgam from the curriculum entirely in 2001. This is largely a response to consumer pressure for white fillings for cosmetic reasons, and also because of the increasing longevity of modern resin composites. These alternative dental restorative materials are not free of potential health risks, such as allergenicity, inhalation of resin dust, cytotoxicity, and retinal damage from blue curing light.

=== Chelation therapy ===
Anti-amalgam sources typically promote the removal of amalgam fillings and the substitution with other materials. Detoxification may also be advised, including fasting, restricted dieting to avoid mercury-containing foods, and quasi-chelation therapies, allegedly to remove accumulated mercury from the body. The American College of Medical Toxicology and the American Academy of Clinical Toxicology recommend against chelation therapy and say that chelation therapy can artificially and temporarily elevate the levels of heavy metals in the urine (a practice referred to as "provoked" urine testing). They also mention that the chelating drugs may have significant side effects, including dehydration, hypocalcemia, kidney injury, liver enzyme elevations, hypotension, allergic reactions, and mineral deficiencies.

=== Epidemiology ===
Better dental health overall coupled with increased demand for more modern alternatives such as resin composite fillings (which match the tooth color), as well as public concern about the mercury content of dental amalgam, have resulted in a steady decline in dental amalgam use in developed countries, though overall amalgam use continues to rise worldwide. Given its superior strength, durability, and long life relative to the more expensive composite fillings, it will likely be used for many years to come. Over a lifetime, dietary sources of mercury are far higher than would ever be received from the presence of amalgam fillings in the mouth. For example, due to pollution of the world's oceans with heavy metals, products such as cod liver oil may contain significant levels of mercury.

=== Prenatal ===
There is little evidence to suggest that amalgam fillings have any negative direct effects on pregnancy outcomes or on an infant post-pregnancy. A study, consisting of 72 pregnant women, was conducted to determine the effects of dental amalgam on fetuses in utero. Results indicated that although the amount of amalgam the mother had was directly related to the amount of mercury in the amniotic fluid, no negative effects on the fetus were found. A larger study, consisting of 5,585 women who had recently given birth, was used to determine if amalgam restorations during pregnancy had any effects on infant birthweight. Among the study group, 1,117 women had infants with low birth weights and 4,468 women had infants with normal birth weights. Approximately five percent of the women had one or more amalgam filling restorations during their pregnancy. These women had little to no difference in infant birth weight compared to the women who did not undergo amalgam restoration during pregnancy.

=== Public awareness ===
A 2006 Zogby International poll of 2,590 US adults found that 72% of respondents were not aware that mercury was a main component of dental amalgam and 92% of respondents would prefer to be told about mercury in dental amalgam before receiving it as a filling. A 1993 study published in FDA Consumer found that 50% of Americans believed fillings containing mercury caused health problems. Some dentists (including a member of the FDA's Dental Products Panel) suggest that there is an obligation to inform patients that amalgam contains mercury.

A prominent debate occurred in the late 20th century, with consumer and regulatory pressure to eliminate amalgam being "at an all-time high". In a 2006 nationwide poll, 76% of Americans were unaware that mercury is the primary component in amalgam fillings, and this lack of informed consent was the most consistent issue raised in a recent U.S. Food and Drug Administration (FDA) panel on the issue by panel members.

The broad lack of knowledge among the public was also displayed when a December 1990 episode of the CBS news program 60 Minutes covered mercury in amalgam. This resulted in a nationwide amalgam scare and additional research into mercury release from amalgam. The following month Consumer Reports published an article criticizing the content of the broadcast, stating that it contained a great deal of false information and that the ADA spokesperson on the program was ill-prepared to defend the claims. For example, 60 Minutes reported that Germany was planning to pass legislation within the year to ban amalgam, but the Institute of German Dentists said one month later that there was no such law pending. Also, one physiologist interviewed by Consumer Reports noted that the testimonials are mostly anecdotal, and both the reported symptoms and the rapid recovery time after the fillings are removed are physiologically inconsistent with that of mercury poisoning. Consumer Reports goes on to criticize how 60 Minutes failed to interview the many patients who had fillings or teeth removed, only to have the symptoms stay the same or get worse.

In 1991, the United States Food and Drug Administration concluded, "none of the data presented show a direct hazard to humans from dental amalgams." In 2002, a class action lawsuit was initiated by patients who felt their amalgam fillings caused them harm. The lawsuit named the ADA, the New York Dental Association, and the Fifth District Dental Society for deceiving "[the] public about health risks allegedly associated with dental amalgam." On 18 February 2003, the New York Supreme Court dismissed the two amalgam-related lawsuits against organized dentistry, stating the plaintiffs had "failed to show a 'cognizable cause of action'".

=== Research directions ===
The proper interpretation of the data is considered controversial only by those opposed to amalgam. The vast majority of past studies have concluded that amalgams are safe. However, although the vast majority of patients with amalgam fillings are exposed to levels too low to pose a health risk, many patients (i.e. those in top 0.1%) exhibit urine test results which are comparable to the maximum allowable legal limits for long-term work place (occupational) safety. Two recent randomized clinical trials in children discovered no statistically significant differences in adverse neuropsychological or renal effects observed over five years in children whose caries were restored using dental amalgam or composite materials. In contrast, one study showed a trend of higher dental treatment need later in children with composite dental fillings, and thus claimed that amalgam fillings are more durable. However, the other study (published in JAMA) cites increased mercury blood levels in children with amalgam fillings. The study states, "during follow-up [blood mercury levels were] 1.0 to 1.5 μg higher in the amalgam group than in the composite group." EPA considers high blood mercury levels to be harmful to the fetus and also states, "exposure at high levels can harm the brain, heart, kidneys, lungs, and immune system of people of all ages." Currently, the EPA has set the "safe" mercury exposure level to be at 5.8 μg of mercury per one liter of blood. While mercury fillings themselves do not increase mercury levels above "safe" levels, they have been shown to contribute to such an increase. However, such studies were unable to find any negative neurobehavioral effects.

== Environmental impact ==
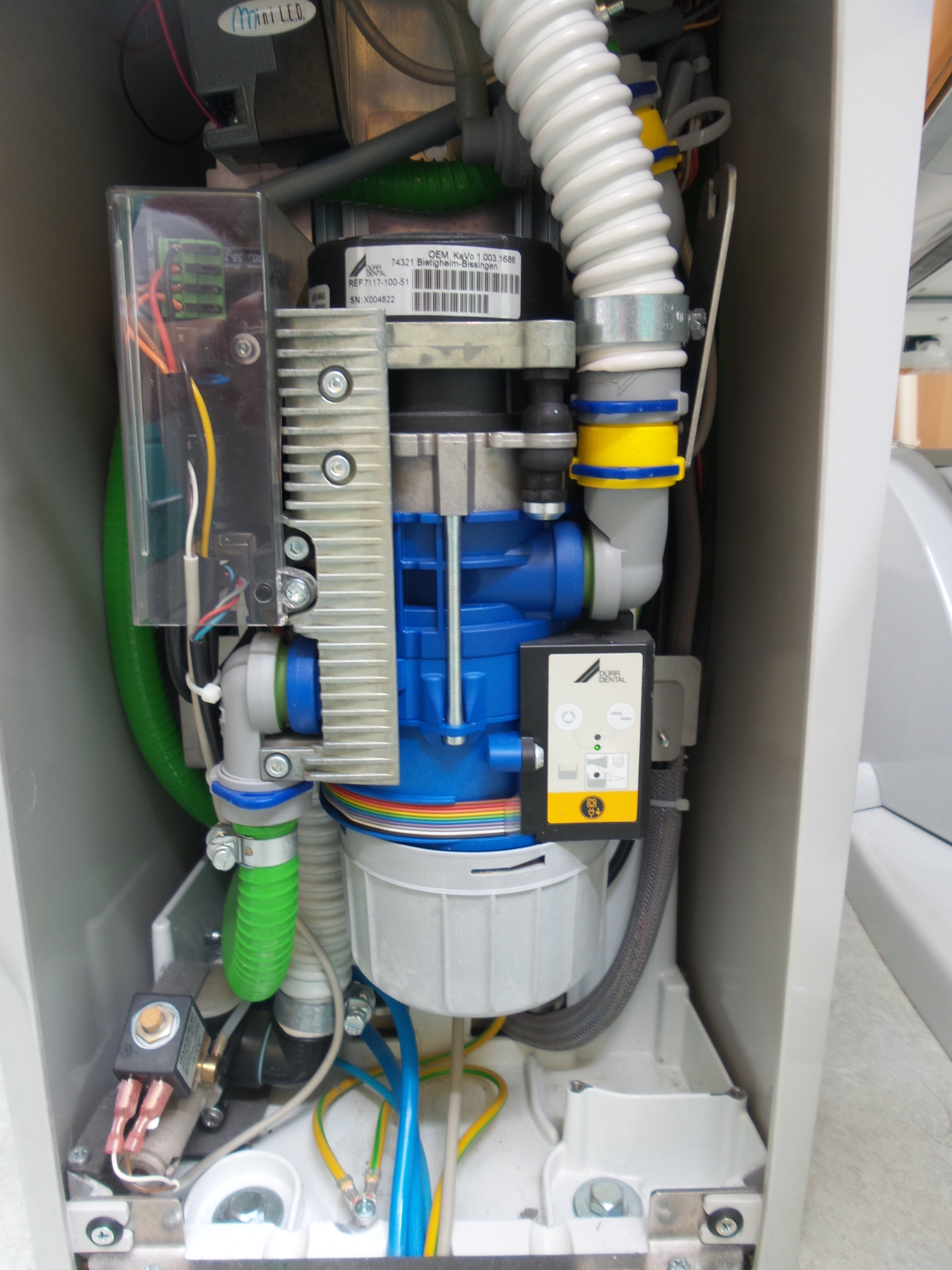
Amalgam separator

Environmental concerns over external costs exist as well. In the United States, dental amalgam is the largest source of mercury received by sewage treatment plants. The mercury contaminates the treatment plant sludge, which is typically disposed of by land application, landfilling or incineration. In the United States, several states, including New Jersey, New York, and Michigan, required the installation of dental amalgam separators before 2017. EPA promulgated an effluent guidelines regulation in 2017 which prohibits most dental practices from disposing amalgam waste down the drain. Most dental offices nationwide are now required to use amalgam separators.

The WHO reported in 2005 that in the United Kingdom, mercury from amalgam accounted for 5% of total mercury emissions. In Canada, dental amalgam was estimated to contribute one-third of the mercury in sewer system waste, but it is believed amalgam separators in dental offices may dramatically decrease this burden on the public sewer system.

The 2005 WHO report stated that mercury from amalgam was approximately 1% of total global mercury emissions, and that one-third of the total mercury in most sewage systems was discharged from dental offices. Other studies have shown this to be a gross exaggeration or not reflective of developed countries. Concerning pollution in the United States, a study done in 1992 showed that batteries "accounted for 86 percent of discarded mercury and dental amalgam a mere 0.56 percent". Mercury is an environmental contaminant and the WHO, OSHA, and NIOSH have established specific occupational exposure limits. Mercury imposes health risks upon the surrounding population. In economics, this pollution is considered an external cost not factored into the private costs of using mercury-based products. Environmental risks from amalgam can be mitigated by amalgam separators, and the ISO has issued standards regarding the proper handling and disposal of amalgam waste. Mercury is a naturally occurring element that is present throughout the environment and the vast majority of the pollution (about 99%) comes from large-scale human industrial activity (such as coal-fired electricity generation, hydroelectric dams, and mining, which increase both airborne and waterborne mercury levels). Eventually, the airborne mercury finds its way into lakes, rivers, and oceans, where it is consumed by aquatic life. Amalgam separators may dramatically decrease the release of mercury into the public sewer system, but they are not mandatory in some jurisdictions. When mercury from these sources enters bodies of water, especially acidic bodies of water, it can be converted into the more toxic methylmercury.

Cremation of bodies containing amalgam restorations results in near-complete emission of the mercury into the atmosphere, as the temperature in cremation is far greater than the boiling point of mercury. In countries with high cremation rates (such as the UK), mercury has become a great concern. Proposals to remedy the situation have ranged from removing amalgam-containing teeth before cremation to installing activated carbon adsorption or other post-combustion mercury capture technology in the flue gas stream. According to the United Nations Environment Programme, it is estimated that globally about 3.6 tonnes of mercury vapor was emitted into the air through cremation in 2010, or about 1% of total global emissions. Mercury emissions from cremation are growing in the US, both because cremation rates are increasing and because the number of teeth in the deceased is increasing due to better dental care. Since amalgam restorations are very durable and relatively inexpensive, many of the older deceased have amalgam restorations. According to work done by the British Environment Agency, aerial mercury emissions from cremation in England were in 2024 the second-largest source after fuel combustion.

== Organizational statements ==
=== American Dental Association (ADA) ===
The American Dental Association (ADA) has asserted that dental amalgam is safe and has held, "the removal of amalgam restorations from the non-allergic patient for the alleged purpose of removing toxic substances from the body, when such treatment is performed solely at the recommendation or suggestion of the dentist, is improper and unethical". Under the comments of the American Dental Association before the FDA's Dental Products Panel of the Medical Devices Advisory Committee, the ADA supports the 2009 FDA ruling on dental amalgam. ADA states, "dental amalgam has an established record of safety and effectiveness, which the scientific community has extensively reviewed and affirmed." The ADA also supports the 2017 EPA wastewater regulation and is providing information and assistance to its members in the implementation of amalgam separators. The ADA asserts the best scientific evidence supports the safety of dental amalgam. Clinical studies have not established an occasional connection between dental amalgam and adverse health effects in the general population.

=== Dental Material Commission ===
In 2002, Dr. Maths Berlin of the Dental Material Commission published an overview and assessment of the scientific literature published between November 1997 and 2002 for the Swedish Government on amalgam and its possible environmental and health risks. A final report was submitted to the Swedish Government in 2003 and included his report as an annex to the full report. In the final report from 2003, Berlin states that the 1997 summary had found "... no known epidemiological population study has demonstrated any adverse health effects in amalgam". He reports that researchers have been able to show effects of mercury at lower concentrations than before and states, "... the safety margin that it was thought existed concerning mercury exposure from amalgam has been erased." He recommends eliminating amalgam in dentistry for medical and environmental reasons as soon as possible.

=== Food and Drug Administration ===
After the FDA's deliberations and review of hundreds of scientific studies relating to the safety of dental amalgam, the FDA concluded, "clinical studies have not established a causal link between dental amalgam and adverse health effects in adults and children age six and older." The FDA concluded that individuals age six and older are not at risk of mercury-associated health effects from mercury vapor exposure that come from dental amalgam.

In 2009, the FDA issued a final rule that classified dental amalgam as a "Class II" (moderate risk) device, placing it in the same category as composite resins and gold fillings. In a press release announcing the reclassification, the agency again stated, "the levels [of mercury] released by dental amalgam fillings are not high enough to cause harm in patients."

Also, in the FDA final regulation on dental amalgam in 2009, the FDA recommended the product labeling of dental amalgam. The suggested labeling included: a warning against the use of dental amalgam in patients with mercury allergy, a warning that dental professionals use appropriate ventilation when handling dental amalgam, and a statement discussing scientific evidence on dental amalgam's risks and benefits to make informed decisions among patients and professional dentists.

In 2020, the FDA updated its guidelines to recommend against amalgam for certain high-risk groups, including children, pregnant and nursing women, people with neurological disease, impaired kidney function, and known sensitivity to mercury, due to the potential harmful health effects of mercury vapor. They acknowledge that breathing in mercury vapor may harm certain populations, but recommend against removal of amalgam fillings unless medically necessary.

== Regulation ==
Mercury in dental fillings is considered safe and effective in all countries practicing modern dentistry (see below). There are currently two countries, Norway and Sweden, that have introduced legislation to prohibit or restrict use of amalgam fillings; however, in both cases amalgam is part of a larger program of reducing mercury in the environment and includes the banning of mercury-based batteries, thermometers, light bulbs, sphygmomanometers, consumer electronics, vehicle components, etc. In many countries, unused dental amalgam after a treatment is subject to disposal protocols for environmental reasons. Over 100 countries are signatories to the United Nations "Minamata Convention on Mercury". Unlike mercury-based batteries, cosmetics, and medical devices, which were banned as of the year 2020, the treaty has not banned the use of dental amalgam, but allows phasing down amalgam use over some time appropriate to domestic needs, an approach advocated by the World Health Organization (WHO).

=== International groups ===
FDI World Dental Federation recognizes the safety and effectiveness of amalgam restorations. FDI is a federation of approximately 200 national dental associations and specialist groups representing over 1.5 million dentists. In collaboration with the WHO, they have produced an FDI position statement and WHO consensus statement on dental amalgam. Their position regarding the safety of dental amalgam is that, aside from rare allergic reactions and local side effects, "the small amount of mercury released from amalgam restorations, especially during placement and removal, has not been shown to cause any other adverse health effects." The paper goes on to say that there have been "no controlled studies published that show adverse systemic effects" from amalgam restorations, and there is no evidence that removing amalgam restorations relieves any general symptoms. More recently, FDI has published a resolution confirming that their position on the safety and effectiveness of amalgam has not changed despite the phasing out in some countries.

=== North America ===
In the United States, numerous respected professional and non-profit organizations consider amalgam use safe and effective and have publicly declared such. In addition to the American Dental Association, other American organizations, including the Mayo Clinic, the U.S. Food and Drug Administration (FDA), Alzheimer's Association, American Academy of Pediatrics, Autism Society of America, U.S. Environmental Protection Agency, National Multiple Sclerosis Society, New England Journal of Medicine, International Journal of Dentistry, National Council Against Health Fraud, The National Institute of Dental and Craniofacial Research NIDCR, American Cancer Society, Lupus Foundation of America, Consumer Reports and WebMD have all given formal, public statements declaring that amalgam fillings are safe based on the best scientific evidence.

On 28 July 2009, the U.S. Food and Drug Administration (FDA) recategorized amalgam as a class II medical device, which critics claim indicates a change in their perception of safety. The ADA has indicated that this new regulation places encapsulated amalgam in the same class of devices as most other restorative materials, including composite and gold fillings.

Despite the research regarding the safety of amalgam fillings, the state of California requires warning information given to patients for legal reasons (informed consent) as part of Proposition 65. This warning also applied to resin fillings for a time, since they contain bisphenol A (BPA), a chemical known to cause reproductive toxicity at high doses.

In Canada, amalgam use is considered safe and effective by some groups. A 2005 position statement from the Canadian Dental Association (CDA) states, "current scientific evidence on the use of dental amalgam supports that amalgam is an effective and safe filling material that provides a long-lasting solution for a broad range of clinical situations. The CDA has established its position based on the current consensus of scientific and clinical experts and on recent extensive reviews of strong evidence by major North American and international organizations, which have satisfactorily countered any safety concerns." Amalgam use is regulated by Health Canada as are all medical treatments and Health Canada has also stated that dental amalgam is not causing illness in the general population.

=== Australia ===
In 2012, the Australian Dental Association published a position paper on the safety of dental amalgam. Their position is "Dental Amalgam has been used as a dental restorative material for more than 150 years. It has proved to be a durable, safe, and effective material which has been the subject of extensive research over this time" and "amalgam should continue to be available as a dental restorative material".

=== Europe ===
Scientific Committee on Emerging and Newly Identified Health Risks (SCENIHR) is a scientific committee within the European Commission. In a 2008 document of 74 pages, its research on the subject of amalgam safety concluded "there is no scientific evidence for risks of adverse systemic effects exist [sic] and the current use of dental amalgam does not pose a risk of systemic disease."

England and Scotland recognize the safety and effectiveness of amalgam restorations. A policy statement from the British Dental Health Foundation states that they do not consider amalgams containing mercury a significant health risk.

Ireland recognizes the safety and effectiveness of amalgam restorations. The Irish Dental Association has published on their website: "Dental amalgam has been used on patients for over 150 years. All available worldwide research indicates that amalgam is not harmful to health.... No Government or reputable scientific, medical or dental body anywhere in the world accepts, on any published evidence, that dental amalgam is a health hazard." The Irish Dental Association provides additional detail in a published patient information letter.

France has publicly recognized the safety and effectiveness of amalgam restorations. A position paper on the Association Dentaire Française website states that amalgam restorations have proven to have no biological or toxic effect. They also mention that no serious pathological fact has ever been observed and no general toxic action has been scientifically proven to date. The most exposed subjects remain dentists, in whom it did not identify occupational diseases related to mercury and other rare that any allergies. These amalgam allergies are about 40 times less than that of resin fillings

During the 1980s and 1990s in Norway, there was considerable and intense public debate on the use of dental amalgam. The Norwegian Dental Patients Association (Forbundet Tenner og Helse), made up of people who believe they suffered health effects from amalgam fillings, was a driving force in this debate. During this time, the media often featured interviews with people claiming that their health problems were caused by amalgam fillings, and who have regained their health after replacing their amalgam fillings with a different material. Some scientific studies also reported that patients have been restored to health after having had their amalgam fillings replaced. However, these studies were heavily disputed at the time and the Norwegian Board of Health still maintains there is no scientifically proven connection between dental amalgam and health problems.

In 1991, organized through the ministry of the environment, Norway began phasing out the use of most mercury-containing products (not limited to amalgam fillings but also including mercury-based batteries, thermometers, sphygmomanometers, consumer electronics, vehicle components, etc.). The ban on the import, export, and use of most mercury-based products began on 1 January 2008. The Norwegian officials stressed that this is not a decision based on using an unsafe health product, but rather that the "overall, long term goal is to eliminate the use and release of mercury to the environment". Despite the mercury ban, dental offices in Norway may apply for exemptions to use amalgam on a case-by-case basis.

Similar to Norway, from 1995 to 2009 the Environment Ministry of the Government of Sweden gradually banned the import and use of all mercury-based products (not limited to amalgam fillings alone, but also including mercury-based batteries, thermometers, sphygmomanometers, consumer electronics, vehicle components, lightbulbs, analytical chemicals, cosmetics, etc.). These mercury-based products were phased out for environmental reasons and precautionary health reasons. Like Norway, there was considerable public pressure in the years leading up to the ban. Since the ban, the Government of Sweden continued to investigate ways of reducing mercury pollution. The Swedish Chemicals Agency states that they may grant exemptions on the use of amalgam on a case-by-case basis.

Following the Minamata Convention on Mercury, from July 2018 onwards, the EU Mercury Regulation prohibits the use of dental amalgam in children under 15 years old and pregnant or breastfeeding women. Additional requirements include the use of pre-encapsulated mercury and the ethical disposal of waste amalgam. On 1 January 2025, dental amalgam was prohibited for use in the EU, except when deemed strictly necessary by the dentist based on the specific needs of the patient. The British Dental Association has worked with the Council of European Dentists to prevent an immediate ban of amalgam until further research into practicalities has been undertaken, which is currently ongoing. The European Commission will report to European Parliament by June 2020, and to the European Council by 2030 regarding the viability of ending dental amalgam use by 2030.

=== Japan ===
In Japan, the use of amalgam began to decline around the 1990s; since 2016, fillings with amalgam alloys have been excluded from insurance coverage. Amalgam is still allowed as of 2023, but is rarely used because it is very expensive. Dental composite and palladium alloys are used instead.

== See also ==
- Erethism
