= Melvin E. Page =

American dentist

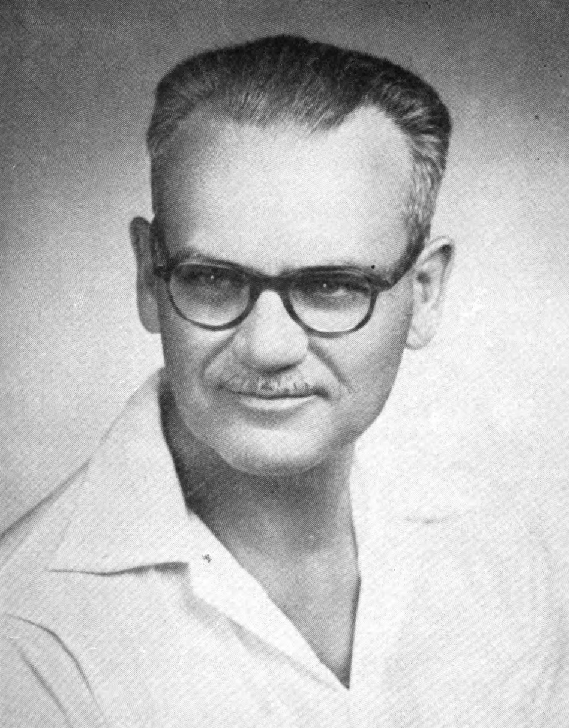
- Born: 1894; Picture Rocks, Pennsylvania
- Died: 1983
- Occupation(s): Dentist, writer

Melvin E. Page (1894-1983) was an American alternative dentistry advocate known for his pseudoscientific views on dental health, dieting and disease.

== Biography ==
Page was born at Picture Rocks, Pennsylvania and established a dentistry practice in Muskegon, Michigan, in 1919. Page was influenced by the pseudo-nutritional ideas of Weston Price. He joined the staff of a nearby hospital where he conducted blood chemistry tests and developed pseudoscientific ideas on dental health. Page argued that for bones and teeth to stay healthy there has to be a calcium-to-phosphorus ratio of 10:4 present in the blood and if this ratio was maintained then absorption of dentures would not occur. Milk and sugar consumption are not recommended as they destroy the correct calcium-phosphorus balance and rot the teeth. Page's ideas were not well received in the dentistry profession and he was deemed a quack. He moved to Florida and whilst waiting for a new dentistry licence took up a career as a fisherman.

Page obtained a new licence and set up a clinic in St. Petersburg in 1940. The clinic conducted unusual practices; for example, his dental patients stayed at the clinic for two weeks and were fed seaweed supplements and had their body chemistry examined. Page clashed with the Food and Drug Administration (FDA) as he marketed a mineral supplement known as "Ce-kelp" with false health claims. In 1940, he was stopped by the FDA for selling Ce-kelp as he advertised the product as curing everything from cataracts to cancer. The FDA charged Page with "unfair and deceptive" acts based on his false claims that Ce-kelp would supply minerals missing from modern diets due to rainfall having washed them from the soil and restoring impoverished glands by supplying necessary salts.

== Balancing body chemistry ==
Page coined the term "balancing body chemistry" which was described by medical experts as a quack concept without scientific basis. He considered tooth decay to be an "outstanding example of systemic chemical imbalances." He promoted the "Page Food Plan" which encouraged people to eat green vegetables and trace minerals to balance their body chemistry. He also utilized micro doses of endocrine extracts to balance the body chemistry of his patients. One of Page's irrational methods was to measure the length of his patients' arms or legs. These anthropological measurements allegedly reflected the "genetic disposition" of how much juice their bodies needed.

Stephen Barrett has commented that:

The general hope of balancing body chemistry is that dietary practices can prevent a wide variety of "degenerative" diseases. Special diets and expensive food supplements are recommended to achieve "balance," and various laboratory tests are used to determine the biochemical state of the patient. Supporters of these methods greatly exaggerate what nutrition can do. Their patients are absorbing false hope and wasting money on lab tests and food supplements.

The idea of balancing body chemistry was also promoted by Page's student Hal Huggins.

== Opposition to milk ==
In his book Degeneration-Regeneration, Page argued that cow's milk is an "unnatural" poison and people should not drink it or give it to their children. He stated that milk consumption is the underlying cause of many diseases including colds, sinus infections, colitis and cancer. Page believed that milk was corrupting modern society and had destroyed ancient civilizations.

Page predicted that "cancer will soon be discovered to be due to constitutional tendency, to consumption of sugar, and to consumption of milk." Instead, he advised people to eat seaweed supplements which he sold under the brand Ce-kelp. Page claimed that more people die of cancer per capita in Wisconsin than any other state and this is evidence that milk is a dangerous food as Wisconsin is a dairy state, known for its milk production. Science writer Martin Gardner described this as one of the "most elementary of statistical fallacies" and noted that "people in Wisconsin tend to be long-lived and since cancer is a disease of middle and elderly years, it is a more frequent cause of death in Wisconsin than in many other states."

Page managed the Biochemical Research Foundation. In the 1940s he conducted a national campaign to stop people other than infants from drinking milk. Page is described as a food faddist with "strange dietary views" in Martin Gardner's Fads and Fallacies in the Name of Science.

== Selected publications ==
- Young Minds with Old Bodies (1944)
- Degeneration-Regeneration (1949)
- Body Chemistry in Health and Disease (1954)
- Health vs. Disease (with H. Leon Abrams, 1960)
- Your Body is Your Best Doctor (with H. Leon Abrams, 1975)
