= Life Sciences Research Office =

American nonprofit organization

Life Sciences Research Organization (LSRO) is a non-profit organization based in Maryland, United States, that specializes in assembling "ad hoc" expert panels to evaluate scientific literature, data, systems, and proposals in the biomedical sciences.

== Overview ==
LSRO was founded in 1962 as an office within the Federation of American Societies for Experimental Biology (FASEB) to fulfill a US military need for independent scientific counsel. In 2000, LSRO became an independent non-profit organization. It changed its name from Life Sciences Research Office to Life Sciences Research Organization in 2010, and in that same year announced the formation of LSRO Solutions which along with LSRO provides independent, impartial scientific analysis and advice. The organization has a reputation for conducting studies on politically charged issues which are of concern to federal agencies or corporations. Some issues include the dental amalgam controversy, dietary supplement monitoring, and "reduced risk" cigarette products.

It has faced scrutiny for its private clients, particularly in relation to tobacco research.

== Past and current clients ==
=== Federal government ===
- Centers for Disease Control and Prevention (CDC)
- Federal Aviation Administration (FAA)
- U.S. Food and Drug Administration (FDA)
- NASA
- National Center for Health Services Research
- National Institutes of Health (NIH)
- Office of Naval Research
- U.S. Army Medical Research and Materiel Command
- United States Department of Agriculture (USDA)
- United States Department of Health and Human Services
- United States National Library of Medicine

=== Private sector ===
- American Physiological Society
- American Society for Nutritional Sciences
- American Society for Pharmacology and Experimental Therapeutics
- Amoco BioProducts Corp
- Biothera
- California Walnut Commission
- Calorie Control Council
- ChemiNutra
- Dow AgroSciences
- Kellogg Company
- Keller and Heckman LLP
- Monsanto Company
- Philip Morris
- Porter Novelli
- Procter & Gamble
- Research-based Dietary Ingredient Association
- RJR Nabisco
- Sandoz Nutrition Corp
- United Dairy Industry Association

== Notable publications ==
- A Study of the Biomedical Problems Related to the Requirements of Troops at Terrestrial Altitudes of 10,000 Feet or Above (1963)
- A Study of the Army Radiation Preservation of Food Program (1963)
- A Study of Research Methodology for Use in the Development of Anti-radiation Agents (1966)
- A Study of Early Radiation-induced Biological Changes as Indicators of Radiation Injury (1969)
- A Review of the Biomedical Effects of Marijuana on Man in the Military Environment (1970)
- A Study of Individual Variability in Dark Adaptation and Night Vision in Man (1970)
- Various reports reviewing GRAS (Generally Recognized As Safe) substances published between 1972 and 1982
- The Nutritional Significance of Dietary Fiber (1977)
- The Need for Special Foods and Sugar Substitutes by Individuals with Diabetes Mellitus (1978)
- A Review of Adverse Reactions From and Hypersensitivity to Peanut and True Nuts (1979)
- Research Needs in Management of Obesity by Severe Caloric Restriction (1979)
- The Role of Dietary Fiber in Diverticular Disease and Colon Cancer (1980)
- An Evaluation of the Potential for Dietary Proteins to Contribute to Systemic Diseases (1982)
- Guidelines for Use of Dietary Intake Data (1988)
- Nutrition and HIV Infection: A Review and Evaluation of the Extant Knowledge of the Relationship between Nutrition and HIV Infection (1990)
- Guidelines for Assessment and Management of Iron Deficiency in Women of Childbearing Age (1991)
- Safety of Amino Acids Used as Dietary Supplements (1992)
- Consistency Between Nutrition Label Information and Laboratory Analysis for 300 Food Products (1996)
- Assessment of Nutrient Requirements for Infant Formulas (1998)
- Military Dental Research Review (2000)
- Review of Infant Formula Nutrient Requirements for Preterm Infants (2001)
- The Scientific Evidence for a Beneficial Health Relationship Between Walnuts and Coronary Heart Disease (2002) -- Report contributed to the approval of the first qualified health claim on a whole food by the FDA.
- Review of Ingredients Added to Cigarettes. Phase One: The Feasibility of Testing Ingredients Added to Cigarettes (2004)
- Recommendations for Adverse Event Monitoring Programs for Dietary Supplements (2004)
- Review and Analysis of the Literature on the Potential Adverse Health Effects of Dental Amalgam (2004)
- Review of Ingredients Added to Cigarettes. Phase Two: Scientific Criteria for the Evaluation of Ingredients Added to Cigarettes (2004)
- Recommendations for Reviewing Research on Advanced First-Responder Resuscitation Fluids and Adjunct Therapies (2005)

== See also ==
- GRAS
- Toxicology
- United States National Academy of Sciences
