= Thomas L. Cleave =

British surgeon (1906-1983)

Thomas Latimer (Peter) Cleave (1906–1983) was a surgeon captain who researched the negative health effects of consuming refined carbohydrate (notably sugar and white flour) which would not have been available during early human evolution. Known as 'Peter' to his friends and colleagues, Cleave was born in Exeter in 1906, and educated at Clifton College. Between 1922 and 1927, he attended medical schools at the Bristol Royal Infirmary, and St Mary's Hospital, London, where he was an academic prodigy winning prize after prize and qualifying at the early age of 21, having passed his primary FRCS examination at the age of 18 and ultimately achieving MRCS and LRCP.

At Bristol, one of his teachers was Rendle Short, who had proposed that appendicitis is caused by a lack of cellulose in the diet. Charles Darwin's writings provided the intellectual framework to Cleave's lifelong engagement with the relationship between diet and health, built upon the premise that the human body is ill-adapted to the diet of modern (western) man.

Cleave's interest focussed on preventative medicine where he observed the harmful effects of the overconsumption of refined carbohydrates such as sugar and refined flour which he called 'The Saccharine Disease'. He noticed that the saccharine manifestations did not occur in wild creatures or among primitive people living on traditional unrefined food.

He considered refined carbohydrates (white flour and sugar) to be the most transformed food, and therefore the most dangerous. After completing his medical training, Cleave entered the Royal Navy in 1927 as Surgeon Lieutenant.

== Military career ==
Between 1938 and 1940, he served as Medical Specialist at RN Hospital, Hong Kong. It was during his war service, in 1941, whilst on the battleship King George V, that he acquired his naval nickname 'the bran man' when he had sacks of bran brought on board to combat the common occurrence of constipation amongst sailors. Cleave's intention was 'to give them bowel movements as efficient as the guns they fired.' The ship assisted in the sinking of the Bismarck. Cleave was on the bridge as the Bismarck was going down and a fellow officer exclaimed to him 'Well done Doc, you deserve a medal, our bowels were working like clockwork!’

Following war service, he worked at Royal Naval Hospitals in Chatham (1945–1948), Malta (1949–1951) and Plymouth (1952–1953). He retired from the Royal Navy in 1962 as Surgeon Captain, having finished his naval career as Director of Medical Research at the RN Medical School

== Post-military career ==
Cleaves unique contribution to medical thought was his realisation that three mechanisms were at work when refined carbohydrates are eaten; fibre depletion, over-consumption and protein stripping, with over-consumption being the most serious.

In 1969, Dr. Cleave brought public attention to the low amount of dietary fiber in modern diets that had become rich in processed ingredients. His work was bolstered by the supporting work of Dr. Denis Burkitt.

== Awards and honors ==
In 1976 Cleave was elected a Fellow of the Royal College of Physicians. In 1979 he was awarded both the Harben gold medal of the Royal Institute of Public Health and Hygiene and the Gilbert Blane medal for naval medicine by the Royal College of Physicians and Surgeons. Dr. Cleave was a 2009 inductee into the Orthomolecular Medicine Hall of Fame.

== Selected publications ==
Cleave published during his lifetime:

=== Articles ===
- Cleave T.L. (1956). "The Neglect of Natural Principles in Current Medical Practice". Journal of the Royal Naval Medical Service. 42 (2): 55–63. doi:10.1136/jrnms-42-55. PMID 13346756.
- Cleave, T. L.; Campbell, G. D. (1966). "Diet and Diverticulitis". British Medical Journal. 2 (5504): 50–51. doi:10.1136/bmj.2.5504.50-c. PMC 1943032. PMID 20848701.
- Cleave, T. L. (1972). "Bran and diverticular disease". British Medical Journal. 2 (5810): 408–409. doi:10.1136/bmj.2.5810.408-b. PMC 1788278. PMID 5023931.
- Cleave, T.L. (1977). "Over-consumption, now the most dangerous cause of disease in westernized countries". Public Health. 91 (3): 127–131. doi:10.1016/s0033-3506(77)80016-4. PMID 882627.

=== Books ===
- Cleave T.L. A Molecular Conception of Organisms and Neoplasms. Bristol: John Wright, 1932.
- Cleave T.L. Fat Consumption and Coronary Heart Disease. Bristol: John Wright, 1957.
- Cleave T.L The Causation of Varicose Veins. Bristol: John Wright, 1960. OL 20707318M
- Cleave T.L Peptic Ulcer. Bristol: John Wright, 1962. ISBN 0723600848; Cleave, T. L. (22 October 2013). 2013 pbk edition. Elsevier. ISBN 978-1-4832-8114-8.
- Cleave T.L, Campbell G.D. Diabetes, Coronary Thrombosis and the Saccharine Disease. Bristol: John Wright, 1966.
- Cleave T.L. The Saccharine Disease. Bristol: John Wright, 1974. ISBN 0723603685; 2013 Kindle Edition. ASIN B01DJDEY3I.
  - Cleave, T. L. (22 October 2013). 2013 pbk edition. Elsevier. ISBN 978-0-7236-0368-9.

== See also ==
- Weston Price

== Sources ==
- Biography
