= Thomas Cowan (alternative medicine practitioner) =

Alternative medicine practitioner

Thomas Samuel Cowan is an American practitioner of alternative medicine, author, conspiracy theorist and former medical doctor. He relinquished his medical license in 2020.

== Career ==
Cowan earned his medical degree from Michigan State University College of Human Medicine in 1984. He ran an alternative medicine practice until July 2020 in San Francisco, California. Cowan was disciplined and put on probation by the Medical Board of California in 2017 after he prescribed medication for breast cancer without informing the patient that it had not been approved by medical authorities, and without reviewing her medical file. The probation period was due to end in 2022, but he renounced his medical license in December 2020 to become an unregulated "health coach". He left California and continues selling supplements through a website.

Cowan is a member of the board of directors of the Weston A. Price Foundation. He served as vice president of the Physicians Association for Anthroposophical Medicine.

== Conspiracy theories ==
Cowan has argued against the widely accepted scientific view that pathogens cause a variety of diseases. He promoted conspiracy theories about the COVID-19 pandemic, claiming 5G wireless communications are responsible for making people sick.

A video of Cowan's claims about COVID-19 and 5G communication, made at an anti-vaccination conference which also featured Andrew Wakefield, quickly gained a widespread audience when it was promoted by multiple Facebook accounts. It was viewed at least 650,000 times on Youtube before being taken down and was also popular on Instagram, where Keri Hilson promoted it to her 2.3 million fans before deleting the post. Experts invited to comment on the video said it repeats several misconceptions common to many anti-vaccination influencers.

The World Health Organization, along with numerous health authorities, established that COVID-19 is not transmitted by any kind of electronic communications and has spread in many regions where new 5G wireless equipment has not been installed.

== Personal life ==
Cowan is married, with three children, one stepson and six grandchildren. He lives in upstate New York.

== Publications ==
The health advice Cowan dispenses through his books is often based in pseudo-scientific theories, such as denying viruses cause disease. Two of them promote anti-vaccination pseudo-scientific theories.
