= Francis M. Pottenger Sr. =

American physician and tuberculosis researcher

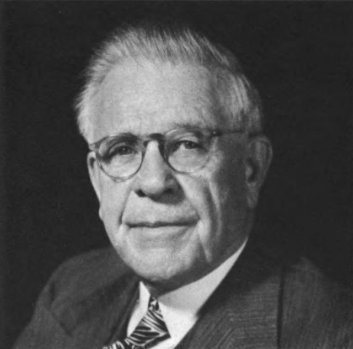
- Born: 27 September 1869; Crosby Township, Ohio
- Died: 10 June 1961 (aged 91); Los Angeles, California
- Occupation: Physician

Francis Marion Pottenger (27 September 1869 – 10 June 1961) was an American physician and tuberculosis researcher.

== Biography ==
Pottenger obtained his MD from the Cincinnati College of Medicine and Surgery in 1894. He qualified A.M. from Otterbein University in 1907 and L.L.D. in 1909. His wife Carrie Burtner died from tuberculosis in 1898 which prompted him to establish the Pottenger Sanitorium in Monrovia, California in 1903. It became the most successful sanitorium in Southern California due to its high recovery rates. Pottenger advocated the use of tuberculin which he believed would create a hostile environment for tuberculosis.

Pottenger founded the Southern California Anti-Tuberculosis League in 1903 for which he was President 1903–1906 and 1939–1941. He was President of the Endocrine Society 1935–1937. In the 1940s, Pottenger was chairman of the Smog Committee of the Los Angeles County Medical Association.

He died at Cedars of Lebanon Hospital, aged 91.

== Family ==
Pottenger married several times. He married his first wife Carrie Burtner in 1894. He had several children with his second wife Adelaide Gertrude Babbit. His son Francis M. Pottenger Jr. was also a physician.

His sister Nellie Maude Pottenger was married to Finis E. Fouts, a soybean pioneer.

== Selected publications ==
- Culture Products in the Treatment of Tuberculosis (1902)
- The Diagnosis and Treatment of Pulmonary Tuberculosis (1908)
- Tuberculin in Diagnosis and Treatment (1913)
- Symptoms of Visceral Disease (1919)
- Clinical Tuberculosis (1922)
- Tuberculosis and How to Combat It: A Book for the Patient (1929)
- The Fight Against Tuberculosis: An Autobiography (1952)
