= Lupus Foundation of America =

Nonprofit organization

- Founded: 1977; 49 years ago
- Purpose: "Improve the quality of life for all people affected by lupus through programs of research, education, support and advocacy."
- Location: Washington, D.C., U.S.
- Region served: United States
- Board Chair: Joseph Arnold
- President and CEO: Louise Vetter
- Medical Director: Susan M. Manzi, MD, MPH
- Revenue: $12.5 million (2016)
- Website: www.lupus.org

The Lupus Foundation of America (LFA), founded in 1977, is a national voluntary health organization based in Washington, D.C., with a network of chapters, offices and support groups located in communities throughout the United States. The Foundation is devoted to solving the mystery of lupus. Its mission is to improve the quality of life for all people affected by lupus through programs of research, education, support and advocacy.

The Lupus Foundation of America is a charitable organization with tax-exempt status granted under Section 501(c)(3) of the Internal Revenue Code. The foundation is a BBB Accredited Charity and highly rated by Charity Navigator.

== Research ==
The LFA's national research program is focused on identifying the causes of lupus, accelerating the development of new treatments and finding cures. It employs a three-pronged approach to advancing the science and medicine of lupus: lead efforts to improve lives today and find cures, fund direct grants to researchers in medical institutions across the U.S. to advance the lupus research field, and advocate for new money and expanded resources from the biggest funders in research: the federal government and the pharmaceutical and biotech industry. The LFA's Center for Clinical Trials Education also provides a comprehensive search tool for clinical trials, points to consider before participating in a clinical trial and a guide to clinical research terms.

LFA's direct grant programs, combined with their advocacy efforts, have led to a total investment of $80 million for lupus research and education.

== Education and support ==
LFA provides answers to questions and gives caring support to people with lupus and their loved ones. The organization works with lupus experts to answer questions, provide tools, resources and referrals to doctors who treat lupus and help guide all those affected by lupus toward a better quality of life.

In 2016, LFA conducted a National Needs Assessment on Lupus to take a broad yet in-depth look at the very specific needs and wants of the diverse lupus patient, caregiver and health care professional communities. In response, the Foundation created the National Resource Center on Lupus. The National Resource Center on Lupus aims to connect, empower and educate those whose lives are impacted by lupus by providing trustworthy, reliable and high-quality resources, programs and emotional support services.

LFA also developed more than 600 medically-reviewed resources in English and Spanish about all aspects of lupus. New content is added on a regular basis developed in response to the needs of the lupus community, including specialized content for children and teens with lupus. Through their National Health Educator Call Center and programs conducted by their National Network, the organization provides direct education, support and referrals for more than 40,000 people. They also provide information to nearly 9 million people through their website annually.

== Advocacy ==
The Lupus Foundation of America and its network of lupus activists across the country have worked diligently to stimulate more than $66 million in federal and state funds for lupus research and education programs. The organization works daily with the United States Congress, federal government agencies and state legislatures to make biomedical research and innovation for lupus a priority. LFA's activists successfully stimulated more than $90 million in new funding for lupus research and education programs since 2004. The Foundation stimulated $28 in federal lupus research and education for every $1 invested in advocacy.

== Awareness ==
LFA's signature fundraising program, Walk to End Lupus Now, has events in more than 60 communities and 70,000 participants, generating visibility, public understanding and support for people with lupus. Money raised is used to support lupus research, education and advocacy programs that serve to improve the quality of life for all people affected by lupus. LFA's multi-media campaign, KNOW LUPUS, continues to educate people about lupus and its impact, has resulted in more than $31 million in donated media and 839 million impressions.
