= National Dental Association =

American professional organization based in Washington, D.C.

- Formation: 1913
- Founder: Weston A. Price
- Type: Professional association
- Headquarters: Washington, D.C.
- Location: United States
- Members: 7,000
- Official language: English
- Website: ndaonline.org

The National Dental Association (NDA) is a professional association of minority dentists based in Washington, D.C., and operating in the United States, Canada and Latin America. Formed in 1913, it is the largest such association in the world. Among the aims of the NDA is extending dental treatment and education to impoverished, disabled or minority populations, as well as those who may not be able to seek proper care due to age. It also works to maintain professional standards in dentistry and to encourage dental careers among minority populations.

== History ==
The seeds of the organization extend back to 1900. In that year, approximately 200 professionals gathered together to form Washington, D.C.'s Washington Society of Colored Dentists, which was retitled in 1907 to the Robert T. Freeman Dental Society. On May 1, 1901, a National Association of Colored Dentists was founded by dentist David A. Ferguson at Howard University College of Dentistry, but it failed to take hold, ceasing meetings after 1906. Since black dentists were still denied membership in such organizations as the American Dental Association, and since dentists felt sidelined in the African-American National Medical Association (NMA), Ferguson tried again in 1913, forming with a total of 29 black dentists the Tri-State Dental Association. The rapid expansion of this association required its renaming in 1918, when it became the Interstate Dental Association with members representing 14 states. The organization continued to expand, including a 1928 affiliation with the recently formed Commonwealth Dental Society of New Jersey. At a meeting of the Commonwealth Dental Society of New Jersey in Bordentown in 1932, a national organization was proposed, and the Interstate Dental Association became the National Dental Association. In 1940, the NDA, which had formerly been associated with the NMA, went fully independent. In 1941, it issued a journal, The Bulletin, which was created and established by former president Dr. Stephen J. Lewis.

During the Civil Rights Movement, the NDA was active in encouraging reform, demanding that dental schools and professional organizations stop discrimination. In 1965, the American Dental Association changed its policies to urge the cessation of discrimination based on race, religion, ethnicity or creed among its member groups and affiliates.

Hazel J. Harper became the first female president of the NDA in 1997.

The NDA has grown beyond the national borders of the United States, adding members in Canada and the Caribbean. In 2009, it was working to expand into Africa and Saudi Arabia.

== Auxiliary organizations ==
The NDA incorporates three auxiliary organizations, including the National Dental Assistants Association, the National Dental Hygienists' Association and the Student National Dental Association.

== Activities ==
In addition to annual professional conferences, the NDA is also involved in educating future dentists. Under the National Dental Association Foundation (NDAF), founded in 1976, the NDA has with cooperation from Colgate-Palmolive been active in promoting research and scholarships at Howard University Dental School and Meharry Medical College School of Dentistry. In addition, members of the NDA are active in outreach, providing dental screening to children and offering services to residents of Jamaica, Trinidad and Guyana.
