= Price-Pottenger Nutrition Foundation =

American non-profit organization

Price-Pottenger Nutritional Foundation
- Abbreviation: PPNF
- Formation: 1952; 74 years ago
- Type: Nonprofit
- Headquarters: Lemon Grove, CA, United States
- Region served: Natural health, alternative medicine, nutrition
- Executive Director: Steven Schindler
- Website: www.price-pottenger.org

The Price-Pottenger Nutrition Foundation (PPNF) is a U.S. 501(c)(3) non-profit organization established "to teach the public and professionals about foods, lifestyle habits, healing modalities, and environmental practices."

== History ==
Founded in 1952, it was first known as the Santa Barbara Medical Research Foundation and later renamed the Weston A. Price Memorial Foundation, in 1965, after the Canadian researcher Weston A. Price who emphasized the importance of nutrition for health and dentistry. The other half of the foundation's name is for Francis M. Pottenger, Jr. whose study of nutrition in cats sparked interest in a diet high in raw animal products including uncooked meats and unpasteurized dairy. In 1969, after Pottenger's death, the organization became the Price Pottenger Foundation, and then the Price Pottenger Nutrition Foundation in 1972.

PPNF now houses over 10,000 books and publications, including the works of Dr. Royal Lee, Dr. Melvin Page, Dr. Emanuel Cheraskin, Dr. William Albrecht, and others. It owns and protects the copyright to the works by Price and Pottenger, and continues to republish Price's Nutrition and Physical Degeneration and Pottenger's Pottenger's Cats – A Study in Nutrition. It publishes its own journal, the Journal of Health and Healing.

== See also ==
- Alternative medicine
- Focal infection theory
- Nutrition
- Saturated fat and cardiovascular disease controversy
