= Holistic dentistry =

Alternative medicine for dentistry

Holistic dentistry, also called biological dentistry, biologic dentistry, alternative dentistry, unconventional dentistry, or biocompatible dentistry, is the equivalent of complementary and alternative medicine for dentistry. As such, it typically incorporates pseudoscientific beliefs and practices.

Although the holistic dental community is diverse in its practices and approaches, common threads include strong opposition to the use of amalgam in dental fillings, nonsurgical approaches to gum disease, and the belief that root canal treatments may endanger systemic health of the patient through the spread of trapped dental bacteria to the body. Many dentists who use these terms regard water fluoridation unfavorably.

== History ==
Holistic dentistry can be traced to the research of Weston A. Price, who blamed tooth decay on modern Western diet habits such as consumption of white flour, pasteurized milk, and processed sugar, which he also linked to criminal behavior. Price's theories were expanded by Melvin E. Page and Hal Huggins, who promoted the pseudoscientific idea of "balancing body chemistry".

The Holistic Dental Network defines the field as: "an approach to Dentistry that promotes health and wellness instead of the treatment of disease. This approach to Dentistry encompasses both modern science and knowledge drawn from the world's great traditions of natural healing...Holistic Dentistry acknowledges and deals with the mind, body, and spirit of the patient, not just his or her "Teeth". They attempt to coin the following basic principles as being unique to holistic dentistry:

- Proper nutrition for the prevention and reversal of degenerative dental disease
- Avoidance and elimination of toxins from dental materials
- Prevention and treatment of dental malocclusion (bite problems=physical imbalance)
- Prevention and treatment of gum disease at its biological basis

The Holistic Dental Association writes of that organization's founding: "In 1978, concerned, dedicated dentists came together to share their common interest in treatment modalities that were not included in the dental school curriculum. Some of these modalities were very new, and others were very old; the one thing that they shared in common was that they offered additional options for treatment. These dentists wished to establish an organization that would provide a forum for the development and sharing of health-promoting therapies. A shift from the early emphasis of the dentist on modalities to a consideration of the attitudes and feelings of the patient and the dentist has occurred. But the primary goal to teach and to learn has not changed since the founding members first met."

== Criticisms ==
The techniques and services practitioners of holistic or biological dentistry offer vary greatly. While many conventional dentists recognize there is significant merit to different preventative approaches to dentistry, some of these dentists have criticized holistic practices for a lack of efficacy of approach and false marketing in their practices.

Many mainstream dental community and skeptics of alternative medicine criticize the practices and opinions among alternative dentists as not being evidence-based.

A significant part of the critique of holistic dentistry is related to the unsubstantiated use of certain services and treatments, many of which have either been investigated and found ineffective or have not been researched enough to be declared safe and effective for practice. For example, herbal remedies are often recommended in the form of mouthwash and toothpaste to prevent or treat certain dental conditions. They are supposedly safer products because they are 'natural.' However, there is a lack of scientific research that supports such treatments, and in fact, herbal remedies have been found to impact the safety of more invasive or prolonged dental procedures, and can lead to additional complications if they interact with a patient's current medications. However, some traditional herbal dental techniques, such as the use of the Miswak stick is of possible effectiveness. However, the realm of herbal dental hygiene remains a largely understudied realm, and further rigorous scientific evaluations will be necessary to determine the efficacy of different methods.

Some critics of holistic dentistry practice also note that the methodologies and equipment used during treatment are not science-backed. A potential example of this is the Cavitat, a non-validated ultrasound device purported to be able to detect alleged lesions described as "cavitations" (see: neuralgia-inducing cavitational osteonecrosis), or the non-evidence-based utilization of breathing apparatus by certain "biologic dentists" during removal of amalgam fillings, intended to reduce mercury toxicity by eliminating inhaled airborne material. However, others argue that such practices are not representative of the entire field of holistic dentistry.

== See also ==
- Dentistry
- Root canal
- Dental spa
- Gum disease
- Alternative medicine
- Focal infection theory
- Weston Price
- George Meinig
- Dental amalgam controversy
