= Hal Huggins =

American dental campaigner

- Born: 1937
- Died: November 29, 2014 (aged 76–77); Colorado Springs, Colorado
- Occupation: Dentist

Hal Alan Huggins (1937 – November 29, 2014) was an American alternative dentistry advocate and campaigner against the use of dental amalgam fillings and other dental therapies that he believed to be unsafe. Huggins began to promote his ideas in the 1970s and played a major role in generating controversy over the use of amalgam. Huggins's license to practice dentistry was revoked in 1996 after a panel found him guilty of gross negligence. Since then, he continued to publish on the topic of mercury and human health and believed that dental amalgam and other dental practices were responsible for a range of serious diseases. Many of Huggins' health claims have been criticized as pseudoscientific and quackery.

== Life and career ==
Huggins received his DDS in 1962 from the University of Nebraska. In 1973, he became involved in the study and research of mercury toxicity and its impact on human health. Through the course of these investigations, Huggins earned an MS from the University of Colorado at Colorado Springs in 1989 with special emphasis in toxicology and immunology.

Huggins subsequently became a prolific campaigner against the use of amalgam dental fillings, creating the Huggins Diagnostic Center in Colorado Springs, Colorado. At the center, patients were charged up to $8,500 apiece for an intensive 2-week course of treatment including the removal of all amalgam fillings. Huggins claimed in his books that the center's profits funded research and free care. The center was closed in September 1995 after a series of lawsuits against Huggins alleging negligence and fraud. TIME reported that despite Huggins's difficulties, some patients continued to swear by his treatments; former Enron chairman Kenneth Lay had his fillings removed by Huggins in 1991 and reported resolution of an "unexplained numbness" as a result.

Huggins received a series of warnings from the U.S. Food and Drug Administration (FDA) for violating good manufacturing practices and marketing unapproved medical devices. In the mid-1980s, Huggins was investigated by the FDA for his marketing of the "Amalgameter", a device which claimed to detect "positively or negative charged dental fillings". The FDA found that the Amalgameter was a simple battery-powered ammeter, but was being promoted with a variety of scientifically unsubstantiated claims about dental fillings. The FDA reported in 1989 that Huggins had ceased manufacturing the device, but that "many could be around to dupe unsuspecting dental patients for a long, long time."

In 1996, a Colorado state judge recommended that Huggins's dental license be revoked, citing his use of "'deceptive yet seductive advertising' to trick chronically ill patients into thinking that the true cause of their illness was mercury." Huggins's license was subsequently revoked by the Colorado State Board of Dental Examiners for gross negligence and the use of unnecessary and unproven procedures. TIME reported the judge's conclusion that Huggins "diagnosed 'mercury toxicity' in all his patients, including some without amalgam fillings."

Huggins contended that the revocation of his license was politically motivated in retaliation for his claims that amalgam fillings caused disease and claimed that he had not worked as a dentist since 1984. His criticisms of dental amalgam were featured on 60 Minutes.

Huggins died on November 29, 2014, at the age of 77.

== Research and beliefs ==
=== Dental ===
Huggins convened a conference on the biocompatibility of dental materials at the University of Colorado at Colorado Springs, with the assistance of a foundation called the Toxic Element Research Foundation that, according to Time magazine, is used by Huggins to promote his views. The participants unanimously signed a statement urging that amalgam fillings be banned immediately.

Huggins has argued that amalgam can cause digestive problems such as Crohn's disease and ulcers, mood disorders such as depression and fatigue, autoimmune diseases such as multiple sclerosis, scleroderma and lupus, high or low blood pressure, arthritis, tachycardia, mononucleosis, and cancers such as leukemia and Hodgkin's disease. In 2002, the National Council Against Health Fraud examined these claims and concluded "there is no scientific evidence that amalgam fillings cause or contribute to the development of these diseases."

In a paper published in Alternative Medicine Review in 1998, Huggins claimed that changes in cerebrospinal fluid that are typical for multiple sclerosis remitted after the removal of amalgam fillings and root canals. Huggins claimed that dental care according to his understanding of dentistry has allowed wheelchair-using patients diagnosed with multiple sclerosis to walk unassisted within weeks. These claims are inconsistent with mainstream scientific consensus on the causes of multiple sclerosis. A meta-analysis examined a range of studies on if there was a link between multiple sclerosis saw a slight increase in the risk of multiple sclerosis associated with amalgam use, but noted that this was not statistically significant. Another study found that although there was a geographical relationship between dental caries and multiple sclerosis, the use of dental amalgam was not associated with this disease.

Huggins's criticisms of dental care were not limited to amalgam fillings; he was also opposed to root canals that he alleges can cause focal infections and illness, and has claimed that implants can cause autoimmune disease. According to a review article on mercury controversy published by Dr. Dodes in the Journal of the American Dental Association, "there are numerous logical and methodological errors in the anti-amalgam literature" and concluded that "the evidence supporting the safety of amalgam restorations is compelling."

The FDA in 2020 commented "the majority of evidence shows exposure to mercury from dental amalgam does not lead to negative health effects in the general population. Exposure to mercury may pose a greater health risk in certain groups of people, who may be more susceptible to potential adverse effects generally associated with mercury."

=== Diet ===
Huggins was influenced by the dietary ideas of Melvin E. Page and promoted the pseudoscientific concept known as "balancing body chemistry". He recommended a low-carbohydrate high-protein diet. The diet emphasized consumption of beef, chicken, turkey and eggs with grains and vegetables. All fish and seafood are forbidden as well as all dairy (apart from butter), processed sugar, white flour and soft drinks. In 1975, the American Dental Association's Council on Dental Research stated "there is little or no evidence to support the broad claims of the Hal Huggins diet."

Huggins opposed the pasteurization of milk, based on his claim that neither animals or humans can assimilate calcium from it.

== Selected publications ==
- Why Raise Ugly Kids?: How You Can Fulfill Your Child's Health and Happiness Potential (1981) ISBN 9780870005077
- It's All in Your Head: The Link Between Mercury Amalgams and Illness (1993) ISBN 9780895295507
- Uninformed Consent : The Hidden Dangers in Dental Care (1999, with Thomas E. Levy) ISBN 9781571741172
- Solving the MS Mystery: Help, Hope and Recovery (2002) ISBN 9780972461115
- Your Goose Isn't Cooked... Yet! (2002) ISBN 9780972461108
- Who Makes Your Hormones Hum??? (2004) ISBN 9780972461122
- It's Right Under Your Nose (2005) ISBN 9780972461139
