= Weston A. Price =

Canadian dentist

Weston A Price
- Born: Weston Andrew Valleau Price; September 6, 1870; Newburgh, Ontario, Canada
- Died: January 23, 1948 (aged 77)
- Education: University of Michigan School of Dentistry
- Occupations: Dentist, Medical Researcher

Weston Andrew Valleau Price (September 6, 1870 – January 23, 1948) was a Canadian dentist known primarily for his theories on the relationship between nutrition, dental health, and physical health. He founded the research institute National Dental Association, which became the research section of the American Dental Association, and was the NDA's chairman from 1914 to 1928.

Price initially did dental research on the relationship between endodontic therapy and pulpless teeth and broader systemic disease, known as focal infection theory, a theory which resulted in many extractions of tonsils and teeth. Focal infection theory fell out of favor in the 1930s and was pushed to the margins of dentistry by the 1950s.

By 1930, Price had shifted his interest to nutrition. In 1939, he published Nutrition and Physical Degeneration, detailing his global travels studying the diets and nutrition of various cultures. The book concludes that aspects of a modern Western diet (particularly flour, sugar, and modern processed vegetable fats) cause nutritional deficiencies that are a cause of many dental issues and health problems. The dental issues he observed include the proper development of the facial structure (to avoid overcrowding of the teeth) in addition to dental caries. This work received mixed reviews, and continues to be cited today by proponents of many different theories, including controversial dental and nutritional theories.

== Life ==
Born in Newburgh, Ontario, Canada, on September 6, 1870, Price graduated from the dental college of the University of Michigan in 1893 and began to practice in Grand Forks, North Dakota. He moved to Cleveland, Ohio, that same year.

Price died in Santa Monica, California on January 23, 1948. His death certificate states malnutrition as the primary cause of his death.

== Research ==
=== Technology development ===
Price conducted research to develop technological solutions to dental diseases. He invented and improved the pyrometer dental furnace for the manufacture of porcelain inlays that included the fusion of metal and porcelain. He researched improvements in producing dental skiagraphs in the early 1900s and developed special instruments for studying the effect of X-rays on cancer. Much of this work was presented at various professional societies in which he had membership. His work with radiographs include pioneering a new radiological technique for studying teeth and using radiographs to analyze endodontically-treated teeth. His 1904 paralleling and bisecting angle techniques would not become popular until the work of Dr. Gordon Fitzgerald of the University of California in the late 1940s. The practice of using radiographs began a new era in dentistry, as dentists could finally see evidence of past dental treatments.

=== Endodontics and focal infection ===
Price spent 25 years of his career performing research on pulpless and endodontically-treated teeth, which supported the theory of focal infection, which held that systemic conditions, including complexion, intestinal disorders, and anemia could be explained by infections in the mouth. This theory held that infected teeth should be treated by dental extraction rather than root canals, to limit the risk of more general illness. His research, based on case reports and animal studies performed on rabbits, claimed to show dramatic improvements after the extraction of teeth with non-vital pulps. Price's research fit into a wider body of testimonials in the dental literature of the 1920s, which contributed to the widespread acceptance of the practice of extracting, rather than endodontically treating, infected teeth. Despite contentions in a 1927 review of Price's work of "faulty bacterial technique" in Price's 1925 publication Dental Infections and related Degenerative Diseases, Price's publication Dental Infections, Oral and Systemic was used as a reference in textbooks and diagnosis guides published in the mid-1930s.

By the 1930s, the theory of focal infection began to be reexamined, and new research shed doubt on the results of previous studies. A 1935 Journal of the Canadian Dental Association article called Price radical, while citing his comment in Dental Infections, Oral and Systemic of "continually seeing patients suffering more from the inconvenience and difficulties of mastication and nourishment than they did from the lesions from which their physician or dentist had sought to give them relief" as a good reason for the use of tooth extraction to be minimized. One researcher in 1940 noted "practically every investigation dealing with the pulpless teeth made prior to 1936 is invalid in the light of recent studies" and that the research of Price and others suffered from technical limitations and questionable interpretations of results.

Three years after Price died in Santa Monica, California, a special review issue of the Journal of the American Dental Association confirmed the shift of standard of care from extraction back to endodontical dentistry. Compared to modern research, Price's studies lacked proper control groups, used excessive doses of bacteria, and had bacterial contamination during teeth extraction, leading to experimental biases.

=== Nutrition ===
Beginning in 1894, Price started to consider diet as the primary factor causing tooth decay. In 1925, he was attracted to calcium metabolism when he became an active student of nutrition. In the early 1930s, Price's research suggested vitamin B and mineral salts were important dietary components to prevent caries.

In 1939, Price published Nutrition and Physical Degeneration, a book that details a series of ethnographic nutritional studies he performed across diverse cultures, including the Lötschental in Switzerland, Native Americans, Polynesians, Pygmies, and Aborigines, among many others. The research materials include some 15,000 photographs, 4,000 slides, and many filmstrips.

In the book, Price claimed that various diseases endemic to Western cultures of the 1920s and 1930s – from dental caries to tuberculosis – were rarely present in non-Western cultures. He argued that as non-Western groups abandoned indigenous diets and adopted Western patterns of living, they showed increases in typical Western diseases. He concluded that Western methods of commercially preparing and storing foods stripped away vitamins and minerals necessary to prevent these diseases.

The 1939 foreword to the book, written by physical anthropologist Earnest A. Hooton, lauded Price's work for confirming previous research that dental caries were less prevalent in "savages" and attempting to establish the etiology for this difference. In 1940, a review in the Canadian Medical Association Journal called the book "a masterpiece of research", comparing Price's impact on nutrition to that of Ivan Pavlov in digestion. In 1950, a review in the journal The Laryngoscope said that "Dr. Price might well be called "The Charles Darwin of Nutrition" while describing Price's documentation of his global travel and research in a book. Other reviews were less sympathetic, with the Scientific Monthly noting some of his conclusions went "much farther than the observations warrant," criticizing Price's controversial conclusions about morality as "not justified by the evidence presented", and downplaying the significance of his dietary findings. Likewise, a review in the Journal of the American Medical Association disagreed with the significance of this nutritional research, noting Price was "observant but not wholly unbiased", and that his approach was "evangelistic rather than scientific."

A 1981 editorial by William T. Jarvis published in Nutrition Today was more critical, identifying Price's work as a classic example of the "myth of the healthy savage," which holds that individuals who live in more technologically primitive conditions lead healthier lives than those who live in more modern societies. The review noted that Price's work was limited by a lack of quantitative analysis of the nutrition of the diets studied, and said he overlooked alternative explanations for his observations, such as malnutrition in primitive societies and overindulgence in the Western diet, rather than the diet itself, as a cause for poorer health. The review makes the assertion that Price had a preconceived positive notion about the health of primitive people, which led to data of questionable value and conclusions that ignored important problems known to afflict their societies, such as periodontal disease.

== Legacy ==
In 1994, George E. Meinig published Root Canal Cover-up Exposed, which resurrected the outdated studies of Rosenow and Price. Concerns were raised that patients hearing about these studies might view them as new and reliable. A book review in the Annals of Dentistry critical of Meinig's book noted Meinig based his ideas entirely on Price's 1923 Dental Infections, Oral and Systemic, and that Meinig's book suffers from a lack of professional editing, makes unsubstantiated claims, confuses basic terms (such as infection and inflammation), and expands into areas unrelated to the main topic. The review states that Price's work has been well discussed and has not been covered up, and notes that although Price's theories were later supplanted by subsequent research that found endodontic treatment is safe and effective, his focus on the biology of teeth and infection is still relevant in modern dentistry, as some clinicians have placed more emphasis on technology and poorly tested procedures for the treatment of infected teeth.

Price is credited with much of the development of holistic dentistry. The Price-Pottenger Nutrition Foundation (PPNF), a non-profit organization established in 1952, with a membership of 28 dentists as of 2008, maintains an archive of Price's manuscripts and photographs and espouses principles of holistic medicine. The Weston A. Price Foundation was co-founded in 1999 by Sally Fallon and nutritionist Mary G. Enig to disseminate his research.

== Controversy ==
Stephen Barrett, writing on his Quackwatch website, dismissed holistic dentistry and much of Price's research, writing "Price made a whirlwind tour of primitive areas, examined the natives superficially, and jumped to simplistic conclusions. While extolling their health, he ignored their short life expectancy and high rates of infant mortality, endemic diseases, and malnutrition. While praising their diets for not producing cavities, he ignored the fact that malnourished people don't usually get many cavities." Barrett asserted that dental problems experienced by native peoples resulted from "abuse" of sweet, fatty, and salty food; exposure to new germs; inactivity; and alcoholism, and described Price's studies on bacterial leakage from root canals as "poorly designed". The Foundation has written a rebuttal to Barrett's claims. William T. Jarvis' article "The Myth of the Healthy Savage" states that his work on primitive diets is still widely sourced by dentists who emphasize nutrition, but argues that it had shortcomings that Price overlooked due to a steadfast ideologically motivated adherence to the notion that the modern diet led to physical degeneration.

== Selected works ==
In a statistical overview derived from writings by and about Weston A. Price, OCLC/WorldCat encompasses roughly 10+ works in 50+ publications in 4 languages and 1,000+ library holdings.

- Dental Infections, Oral and Systemic (1923) Penton publishing company; Cleveland, OH
- Nutrition and Physical Degeneration: A Comparison of Primitive and Modern Diets and Their Effects (1939) Paul B. Hoeber, Inc; Medical Book Department of Harper & Brothers
- 1925. "Dental Infections and related Degenerative Diseases" J Am Med Assoc 1925;84(4):254–261.

== See also ==
- Thomas L. Cleave
- Robert Corruccini
- Albert Howard
- Robert McCarrison
- Michael Pollan
