= C. Edmund Kells =

American dentist and inventor

- Born: October 21, 1856; New Orleans, Louisiana, U.S.
- Died: May 7, 1928 (aged 71); New Orleans, Louisiana, U.S.
- Education: New York College of Dentistry
- Years active: 1878–1928
- Medical career
- Profession: Dentist
- Field: General dentistry Dental radiography

Clarence Edmund Kells Jr. (1856–1928) was an American dentist and inventor who is sometimes described as "the father of dental radiography". He practiced dentistry in New Orleans for 50 years and held about 30 patents for dental and electrical devices. He introduced a suction apparatus for use by both dentists and surgeons, took some of the earliest X-rays of the teeth of live patients, hired the first female dental assistant, and had one of the first dental offices with electricity.

A graduate of the New York College of Dentistry, Kells joined his father's dental practice in 1878, and they worked together until his father died in 1896. In 1908, Kells moved his office to the Maison Blanche building. He wrote two books on dentistry and contributed three chapters to a popular dental textbook. He finished the manuscript for a third book on the conservation of teeth, but it was never published.

Kells was an outspoken critic of focal infection theory, the widely held belief that mass dental extraction would stop tooth infections from causing problems in other parts of the body. Some influential physicians supported the theory, but Kells believed it was causing dentists to perform countless unnecessary extractions. By 1919, he was warning dentists that they should refuse to extract teeth at the request of physicians.

For about the last 20 years of his life, Kells suffered from skin cancer related to radiation exposure, and he had about 30 surgeries on his fingers, hands and arms. By the late 1920s, most of his left arm had been amputated, and the cancer was spreading up his right arm. In chronic pain, losing his eyesight, and worried about becoming dependent on others, Kells fatally shot himself in 1928.

== Early life ==
Born in New Orleans on October 21, 1856, Kells was the son of Achsah (née Cook) and Charles Edmund Kells Sr. His father was a well-known dentist and faculty member at New Orleans Dental College. His mother died when he was four. He had some clear memories from the Civil War, such as when Union soldiers would march near his home and accidentally step into hidden trenches filled with metal stakes. Kells described Reconstruction as "those dark and tragic times of our fair Southland".

Kells joined the White League when he was 17, which he said was organized for the purpose of "overthrowing the 'carpet bag' government". He was sent to New Hampshire for health purposes in the summer of 1874, so he missed the events of the Battle of Liberty Place on September 14, 1874, when the White League temporarily ousted Louisiana governor William Pitt Kellogg. Although the governor was restored to power after three days, Kells later wrote that the White League "wiped out the carpet bag despots and the white people resumed the reins of government ... Louisianans became freemen once more."

By the age of 18, Kells was attending New Orleans Dental College and spending time at his father's dental practice as a student. In 1876, he moved to New York, where he attended the New York College of Dentistry, from which he graduated after two years. Kells was highly intrigued by electricity, and while he was in New York, he often visited Thomas Edison's laboratory in Menlo Park, New Jersey.

== Early career and growing influence ==
After returning to New Orleans following dental school, Kells joined his father at the clinic that the elder Kells had opened in 1850. They worked together until his father's death in 1896. In 1885, Kells hired the first female dental assistant (sometimes referred to as a "lady in attendance") in the United States. At that time it was considered improper for a woman to visit a dentist unaccompanied by a man, and the presence of a female dental assistant allowed women to seek dental care on their own. The assistant performed clerical work, but within 15 years, Kells had both clerical and clinical assistants.

Shortly after the discovery of X-rays in 1895, Kells began work with Tulane University professor Brown Ayres to consider the potential for dental X-rays. There were significant and underappreciated safety concerns associated with radiography. The resistance of an X-ray tube had to be adjusted before each image was taken. To accomplish this, the left hand of the operator was placed between the X-ray tube and a fluoroscope, and the rheostat was adjusted until the operator's hand bones came into focus. Because of such techniques, early radiographers like Kells were exposed to very high cumulative doses of radiation. In addition, until about 1917, an uninsulated wire delivered a high-voltage electric current to the X-ray tube, creating a risk of electric shock for the patient and the operator.

Kells introduced dental X-rays at a July 1896 meeting of the Southern Dental Association in North Carolina. This is thought to be the first time that intraoral X-rays were taken on a live person in the United States. The subject was Kells's dental assistant. Kells designed an X-ray film holder that allowed the subject to swallow while holding the film with the teeth, and he stabilized the subject's head by placing a thin board between the head and the X-ray tube. With the thin board, Kells had unknowingly created the first X-ray filter and likely prevented radiation injury to his subject. During part of his conference presentation, Kells showed fluoroscopic images of the bones of the hand, causing curious hotel guests to file into the conference room. Because of Kells's influence in developing imaging techniques, he has been referred to as "the father of dental radiography".

Kells had one of the first dental offices with electricity. He held patents for more than 30 inventions, including an electric dental unit, a fire extinguisher and alarm, an electric air compressor, a drinking fountain, an electromagnetic clock, and an electric mouth lamp. One of Kells's most widely used innovations was an electric suction apparatus that could aspirate fluid or irrigate a body cavity. The device was utilized in dentistry and various types of surgery. Before the emergence of this apparatus, such fluids had to be mopped up with surgical sponges. Surgeon Rudolph Matas said that Kells had "won the gratitude of every working surgeon in the world."

== Later career and illness ==
In 1907, Kells moved his office to a suite in the Maison Blanche building on Canal Street in New Orleans. The next year, he noticed a non-healing sore on his left thumb, and he went to Johns Hopkins Hospital in Baltimore for a partial amputation. Kells underwent about 30 such surgeries on his fingers and hands for radiation-induced skin cancer. Ultimately, most of his left arm was amputated. Though he continued to work and to write about dentistry, he was in a great deal of pain from new lesions, associated skin grafts, and other treatments. He refused to take narcotic drugs.

Dr. Major Varnado joined Kells at his dental clinic in 1918. The next year, Kells stopped seeing general dentistry patients and focused his practice on dental radiography and minor oral surgery.

Late in his career, Kells was a vocal critic of focal infection theory, the idea that minor infections in one part of the body spurred more serious infections such as meningitis and osteomyelitis. Surgeon William Hunter promoted this theory in the UK, and physician Frank Billings introduced it to the United States. Based on a belief in focal infection theory, physicians often referred their patients to dentists for mass tooth extractions. Even influential physicians like Charles Horace Mayo believed that tooth extractions would cure a wide variety of illnesses.

Kells criticized focal infection theory at a 1919 meeting of the National Dental Association. He later called mass extractions a "crime" and said that dentists should avoid extracting teeth at the request of physicians. He was particularly disturbed by the fact that some dentists used X-rays to justify mass tooth extraction. By the 1950s, few dentists believed that the evidence supported focal infection theory.

Late in his life, Kells wrote two books. The Dentist's Own Book (1925) discussed the basics of dental care and was once a standard text provided to graduating dental students. Three Score Years and Nine (1926) covered technical aspects of dentistry, but it also included Kells's reflections on his life and career. Kells described his reasoning for the book and its title:

As I understand it, three score years and ten are the scriptural allotment to man, consequently, if a man happens to want to record what has happened to him during his own allotment, he had better start in a year or more before its end, or he may not get the opportunity to do so. Therefore this "three score years and nine."

== Personal life ==
Kells married Florence J. Hobson in March 1883. The next year, Kells purchased a lot at 9 Audubon Place in the Audubon Place neighborhood of New Orleans, and he had a two-story house built there. The couple had one daughter.

== Death and legacy ==
In the late 1920s, the skin cancer was spreading up Kells's right arm, and his vision was failing. He grew increasingly fearful that he might become a burden to others as the disease progressed. Still, in an article he wrote from a hospital bed shortly before he died, he expressed no significant regret:

Do I murmur at the rough deal the fates have dealt me? No, I can't do that. When I think of the thousands of suffering patients who are benefited every day by the use of X-rays, I cannot complain. That a few should suffer for the benefit of millions is a law of nature.

On May 7, 1928, Kells died of a self-inflicted gunshot wound at his dental clinic, where two of his dental assistants found him lying on a couch in his private office. Just before his death, he finished the manuscript for what would have been his third book, Conservation of Natural Teeth. The book was not published. After Kells died, C. N. Johnson said that colleagues admired Kells's intelligence, versatility, and intuition, but he said that "best of all was the heart of him – his great, luminous and loyal heart that never beat an unworthy stroke in all his 72 years." A 1972 journal article described Kells's death as "one of the greatest tragedies in the history of dentistry."

The C. Edmund Kells Honor Society recognizes outstanding students in the School of Dentistry at the LSU Health Sciences Center New Orleans.

Tulane University awarded Kells an honorary Doctor of Laws in 1927. At the same time, the school established the C. Edmund Kells Library and Museum. Kells donated books and instruments to the museum and had some colleagues do the same, but Tulane's dental school closed the next year. More than 20 years later, Varnado found some of the items in a storeroom under Tulane Stadium. Varnado practiced at Kells's clinic until his death in 1971, and his death marked the end of the 121-year-old practice that was passed down from Kells and his father. When Varnado died, some of the furniture and equipment from his office was transported to the LSU School of Dentistry. Combined with some of the collectibles from the original Kells Library and Museum, these office items were used in a library exhibit honoring Kells at LSU.
