= Focal infection theory =

Archaic theory of chronic disease

Focal infection theory is the historical concept that many chronic diseases, including systemic and common ones, are caused by focal infections. A focal infection is a localized infection, often asymptomatic, that causes disease elsewhere in the host, but the present medical consensus is that focal infections are fairly infrequent and mostly limited to fairly uncommon diseases. (Distant injury is focal infection's key principle, whereas in ordinary infectious disease, the infection itself is systemic, as in measles, or the initially infected site is readily identifiable and invasion progresses contiguously, as in gangrene.) Historical focal infection theory, rather, so explained virtually all diseases, including arthritis, atherosclerosis, cancer, and mental illnesses.

An ancient concept that took modern form around 1900, focal infection theory was widely accepted in medicine by the 1920s. In the theory, the focus of infection might lead to secondary infections at sites particularly susceptible to such microbial species or toxin. Commonly alleged foci were diverse—appendix, urinary bladder, gall bladder, kidney, liver, prostate, and nasal sinuses—but most commonly were oral. Besides dental decay and infected tonsils, both dental restorations and especially endodontically treated teeth were blamed as foci. The putative oral sepsis was countered by tonsillectomies and tooth extractions, including of endodontically treated teeth and even of apparently healthy teeth, newly popular approaches—sometimes leaving individuals toothless—to treat or prevent diverse diseases.

Drawing severe criticism in the 1930s, focal infection theory—whose popularity zealously exceeded consensus evidence—was discredited in the 1940s by research attacks that drew overwhelming consensus of this sweeping theory's falsity. Thereupon, dental restorations and endodontic therapy became again favored. Untreated endodontic disease retained mainstream recognition as fostering systemic disease. But only alternative medicine and later biological dentistry continued highlighting sites of dental treatment—still endodontic therapy, but, more recently, also dental implant, and even tooth extraction, too—as foci of infection causing chronic and systemic diseases. In mainstream dentistry and medicine, the primary recognition of focal infection is endocarditis, if oral bacteria enter blood and infect the heart, perhaps its valves.

Entering the 21st century, scientific evidence supporting general relevance of focal infections remained slim, yet evolved understandings of disease mechanisms had established a third possible mechanism—altogether, metastasis of infection, metastatic toxic injury, and, as recently revealed, metastatic immunologic injury—that might occur simultaneously and even interact. Meanwhile, focal infection theory has gained renewed attention, as dental infections apparently are widespread and significant contributors to systemic diseases, although mainstream attention is on ordinary periodontal disease, not on hypotheses of stealth infections via dental treatment. Despite some doubts renewed in the 1990s by conventional dentistry's critics, dentistry scholars maintain that endodontic therapy can be performed without creating focal infections.

== Rise and popularity (1890s–1930s) ==
=== Roots and dawn ===
==== Germ theory ====
Hippocrates, in ancient Greece, had reported cure of an arthritis case by tooth extraction. Yet focal infection, as such, appeared in modern medicine in 1877, when Karl Weigert reported "dissemination of 'tuberculosis poison' ". The prior year's breakthrough by Robert Koch, a fellow German, had launched medical bacteriology—a set of laboratory methods to isolate, culture, and multiply a single bacterium of one species—whereby Koch announced discovery of the "tubercle bacillus" in 1882, fully premising the modern principle of focal infection. In 1884, William Henry Welch, tasked to design the medical department at the newly forming Johns Hopkins University, imported the German model, "scientific medince", to America.

As progressively more diseases drew an infectious hypothesis that led to a pathogen discovery, conjectures grew that virtually all diseases are infectious. In 1890, German dentist Willoughby D Miller attributed a set of oral diseases to infections, and attributed a set of extraoral diseases—as of lung, stomach, brain abscesses, and other conditions—to the oral infections. In 1894, Miller became the first to identify bacteria in samples of tooth pulp. Miller advised root canal therapy. Yet ancient and folk concepts, entrenched as Galenic principles of humoral medicine, found new outlet in medical bacteriology, a pillar of the new "scientific medicine". Around 1900, British surgeons, still knife-happy, were urging "surgical bacteriology".

==== Autointoxication ====
In 1877, French chemist Louis Pasteur adopted Robert Koch's bacteriology protocols, but soon directed them to developing the first modern vaccines, and ultimately introduced rabies vaccine in 1885. Its success funded Pasteur's formation of the globe's first biomedical research institute, the Pasteur Institute. In 1886, Pasteur welcomed to Paris the emigration from Russia by international scientific celebrity Elie Metchnikoff—discoverer of phagocytes, mediating innate immunity—whom Pasteur granted an entire floor of the Pasteur Institute, once it opened in 1888. Later the institute's director and a 1908 Nobelist, Metchnikoff believed, as did his German immunology rival Paul Ehrlich—theorist on antibody, mediating acquired immunity—and as did Pasteur, too, that nutrition influences immunity. Metchnikoff brought to France its first yogurt cultures for probiotic microorganisms to suppress the colon's putrefactive microorganisms, which allegedly fostered the colon's toxic seepage causing degenerative disease, the putative phenomenon termed autointoxication. Metchnikoff reasoned that the colon functions as a "vesitigal cesspool" that stores waste but is unneeded.

Abdominal surgery's pioneer, Sir Arbuthnot Lane, based in London, drew from Metchnikoff and clinical observation to identify "chronic intestinal stasis"—in lay terms, intractable constipation—presumably, "flooding of the circulation with filthy material". Reporting surgical treatment in 1908, Lane eventually offered total colon removal, but later favored simply surgical release of colonic "kinks", and in 1925, abandoning surgery, began promoting prevention and intervention by diet and lifestyle, how Lane secured his contemporary reputation as a crank. Since 1875, in the American state Michigan, physician John Harvey Kellogg had targeted "bowel sepsis"—an allegedly prime cause of degeneration and disease—at his health resort, Battle Creek Sanitarium. Having, in fact, coined the term sanitarium, Kellogg yearly received several thousand patients, including US Presidents and celebrities, at his huge resort, advertised as the "University of Health". But in the 1910s, as North American medical schools emulated the German model—that is, "scientific medicine"—medical doctors who recognized "focal infection" were hinting a scientific basis versus the older, alleged "health faddists" like medical doctor Kellogg and like minister Sylvester Graham.

=== Medical popularity ===
==== Hunter on "oral sepsis" ====
In 1900, British surgeon William Hunter blamed many disease cases on oral sepsis. In 1910, lecturing in Montreal at McGill University, Hunter declared, "The worst cases of anemia, gastritis, colitis, obscure fevers, nervous disturbances of all kinds from mental depression to actual lesions of the cord, chronic rheumatic infections, kidney diseases are those which owe their origin to or are gravely complicated by the oral sepsis produced by these gold traps of sepsis." Thus, he apparently indicted dental restorations. Incriminating their execution, rather, his American critics lobbied for stricter requirements on dentistry licensing. Still, Hunter's lecture—as later recalled—"ignited the fires of focal infection". Ten years later, he proudly accepted that credit. And yet, read carefully, his lecture asserts a sole cause of oral sepsis: dentists who instruct patients to never remove partial dentures.

==== Billings & Rosenow ====
Focal infection theory's modern era really began with physician Frank Billings, based in Chicago, and his case reports of tonsillectomies and tooth extractions that apparently cured infections of distant organs. Replacing Hunter's term oral sepsis with focal infection, Billings in November 1911 lectured at the Chicago Medical Society, and published it in 1912 as an article for the American medical community. In 1916, Billings lectured in California at Stanford University Medical School, this time printed in book format. Billings thus popularized intervention by tonsillectomy and tooth extraction. A pupil of Billings, Edward Rosenow held that extraction alone was often insufficient, and urged teamwork by dentistry and medicine. Rosenow developed the principle elective localization, whereby microorganisms have affinities for particular organs, and also espoused extreme pleomorphism, whereby a bacterium can drastically change form and perhaps evade conventional detection methods.

==== Preeminent recognition ====
Since 1889, in the American state Minnesota, brothers William Mayo and Charles Mayo had built an international reputation for surgical skill at their Mayo Clinic, by 1906 performing some 5,000 surgeries a year, over 50% intra-abdominal, a tremendous number at the time, with unusually low mortality and morbidity. Though originally distancing themselves from routine medicine and skeptical of laboratory data, they later recruited Edward Rosenow from Chicago to help improve Mayo Clinic's diagnosis and care and to enter basic research via experimental bacteriology. Rosenow influenced Charles Mayo, who by 1914 published to support focal infection theory alongside Rosenow.

At Johns Hopkins University's medical school, launched in 1894 as America's first to teach "scientific medicine", the eminent Sir William Osler was succeeded as professor of medicine by Llewellys Barker, who became a prominent proponent of focal infection theory. Although many of the Hopkins medical faculty remained skeptics, Barker's colleague William Thayer cast support. As Hopkins' chief physician, Barker was a pivotal convert propelling the theory to the center of American routine medical practice. Russell Cecil, famed author of Cecil's Essentials of Medicine, too, lent support. In 1921, British surgeon William Hunter announced that oral sepsis was "coming of age".

Although physicians had already interpreted pus within a bodily compartment as a systemic threat, pus from infected tooth roots often drained into the mouth and thereby was viewed as systemically inconsequential. Amid focal infection theory, it was concluded that that was often the case—while immune response prevented dissemination from the focus—but that immunity could fail to contain the infection, that dissemination from the focus could ensue, and that systemic disease, often neurological, could result. By 1930, excision of focal infections was considered a "rational form of therapy" undoubtedly resolving many cases of chronic diseases. Its inconsistent effectiveness was attributed to unrecognized foci—perhaps inside internal organs—that the clinicians had missed.

=== Dental reception ===
In 1923, upon some 25 years of researches, dentist Weston Andrew Price of Cleveland, Ohio, published a landmark book, then a related article in the Journal of the American Medical Association in 1925. Price concluded that after root canal therapy, teeth routinely host bacteria producing potent toxins. Transplanting the teeth into healthy rabbits, Price and his researchers duplicated heart and arthritic diseases. Although Price noted often seeing patients "suffering more from the inconvenience and difficulties of mastication and nourishment than they did from the lesions from which their physician or dentist had sought to give them relief", his 1925 debate with John P Buckley was decided in favor of Price's position: "practically all infected pulpless teeth should be extracted". As chairman of the American Dental Association's research division, Price was a leading influence on the dentistry profession's opinion. Into the late 1930s, textbook authors relied on Price's 1923 treatise.

In 1911, the year that Frank Billings lectured on focal infection to the Chicago Medical Society, unsuspected periapical disease was first revealed by dental X-ray. Introduced by C. Edmund Kells, dental radiography to feed the "mania of extracting devitalized teeth". Even Price was cited as an authoritative source espousing conservative intervention at focal infections. Kells, too, advocated conservative dentistry. Many dentists were "100 percenters", extracting every tooth exhibiting either necrotic pulp or endodontic treatment, and extracted apparently healthy teeth, too, as suspected foci, leaving many persons toothless. A 1926 report published by several authors in Dental Cosmos—a dentistry journal where Willoughby Miller had published in the 1890s—advocated extraction of known healthy teeth to prevent focal infection. Endodontics nearly vanished from American dental education. Some dentists held that root canal therapy should be criminalized and penalized with six months of hard labor.

=== Psychiatric promulgation ===
Near the turn of the 20th century, psychiatry's predominant explanations of schizophrenia's causation, besides heredity, were focal infection and autointoxication. In 1907, psychiatrist Henry Andrews Cotton became director of the psychiatric asylum at Trenton State Hospital in the American state New Jersey. Influenced by focal infection theory's medical popularity, Cotton identified focal infections as the main causes of dementia praecox (now schizophrenia) and of manic depression (now bipolar disorder). Cotton routinely prescribed surgery not only to clean the nasal sinuses and to extract the tonsils and the teeth, but also to remove the appendix, gall bladder, spleen, stomach, colon, cervix, ovaries, and testicles, while Cotton claimed up to 85% cure rate.

Despite Cotton's death rate of some 30%, his fame rapidly spread through America and Europe, and the asylum drew influx of patients. The New York Times heralded "high hope". Cotton made a European lecture tour, and Princeton University Press and Oxford University Press simultaneously published his book in 1922. Despite skepticism in the profession, psychiatrists sustained pressure to match Cotton's treatments, as patients would ask why they were being denied curative treatment. Other patients were pressured or compelled into the treatment without their own consent. Cotton had his two sons' teeth extracted as preventive healthcare—although each later committed suicide. In the 1930s, however, focal infection fell from psychiatry as an explanation, Cotton having died in 1933.

== Criticism and decline (1930s–1950s) ==
=== Early skepticism ===
Addressing the Eastern Medical Society in December 1918, New York City physician Robert Morris had explained that focal infection theory had drawn much interest but that understanding was incomplete, while the theory was earning disrepute through overzealousness of some advocates. Morris called for facts and explanation from scientists before physicians continued investing so steeply in it, already triggering vigorous disputes and embittering divisions among clinicians as well as uncertainty among patients.

In 1919, the American Dental Association's forerunner, the National Dental Association, held in New Orleans its annual meeting, where C Edmund Kells, the originator and pioneer of dental X-ray, delivered a lecture, published in 1920 in the association's journal, largely discussing focal infection theory, which Kells condemned as a "crime". Kells stressed that X-ray technology is to improve dentistry, not to enhance the "mania of extracting devitalized teeth". Kells urged dentists to reject physicians' prescriptions of tooth extractions.

Focal infection theory's elegance suggested simple application, but the surgical removals brought meager "cure" rate, occasional disease worsening, and inconsistent experimental results. Still, the lack of controlled clinical trials, among present criticism, was normal at the time—except in New York City. Around 1920, at Henry Cotton's claims of up to 85% success treating schizophrenia and manic depression, Cotton's major critic was George Kirby, director of the New York State Psychiatric Institute on Ward's Island. As colleagues of Kirby, two researchers—bacteriologist Nicolas Kopeloff and psychiatrist Clarence Cheney—ventured from Ward's Island to Trenton, New Jersey, to investigate Cotton's practice.

=== Research attacks ===
In two controlled clinical trials with alternate allocation of patients, Nicolas Kopeloff, Clarence Cheney, and George Kirby concluded Cotton's psychiatric surgeries ineffective: those who improved were already so prognosed, and others improved without surgery. Publishing two papers, the team presented the findings at the American Psychiatric Association's 1922 and 1923 annual meetings. At Johns Hopkins University, Phyllis Greenacre questioned most of Cotton's data, and later helped steer American psychiatry into psychoanalysis. Antipsychotic colectomy vanished except in Trenton until Cotton—who used publicity and word of mouth, kept the 30% death rate unpublicized, and passed a 1925 investigation by New Jersey Senate—died by heart attack in 1933.

By 1927, Weston Price's researches had been criticized for allegedly "faulty bacterial technique". In the 1930s and 1940s, researchers and editors dismissed the studies of Price and of Edward Rosenow as flawed by insufficient controls, by massive doses of bacteria, and by contamination of endontically treated teeth during extraction. In 1938, Russell Cecil and D Murray Angevine reported 200 cases of rheumatoid arthritis, but no consistent cures by tonsillectomies or tooth extractions. They commented, "Focal infection is a splendid example of a plausible medical theory which is in danger of being converted by its enthusiastic supporters into the status of an accepted fact." Newly a critic, Cecil alleged that foci were "anything readily accessible to surgery".

In 1939, E W Fish published landmark findings that would revive endodontics. Fish implanted bacteria into guinea pigs' jaws, and reported that four zones of reaction consequently developed. Fish reported that the first zone was the zone of infection, whereas the other three zones—surrounding the zone of infection—revealed immune cells or other host cells but no bacteria. Fish theorized that by removing the infectious nidus, dentists would permit recovery from the infection This reasoning and conclusion by Fish became the basis for successful root-canal treatment. Still, endodontic therapy of the era indeed posed substantial risk of failure, and fear of focal infection crucially motivated endontologists to develop new and improved technology and techniques.

=== End of the focal era ===
The review and "critical appraisal" by Hobart A Reimann and W Paul Havens, published in January 1940, was perhaps the most influential criticism of focal infection theory. Recasting British surgeon William Hunter's landmark pronouncements of 30 years earlier as widely misinterpreted, they summarized that "the removal of infectious dental focal infections in the hope of influencing remote or general symptoms of disease must still be regarded as an experimental procedure not devoid of hazard". By 1940, Louis I Grossman's textbook Root Canal Therapy flatly rejected the methods and conclusions made earlier by Weston Price and especially by Edward Rosenow. Amid improvements in endodontics and medicine, including release of sulfa drugs and antibiotics, a backlash to the "orgy" of tooth extractions and tonsillectomies ensued.

K A Easlick's 1951 review in the Journal of the American Dental Association notes, "Many authorities who formerly felt that focal infection was an important etiologic factor in systemic disease have become skeptical and now recommend less radical procedures in the treatment of such disorders". A 1952 editorial in Journal of the American Medical Association tolled the era's end by stating that "many patients with diseases presumably caused by foci of infection have not been relieved of their symptoms by removal of the foci", that "many patients with these same systemic diseases have no evident focus of infection", and that "foci of infection are as common in apparently healthy persons as in those with disease". Although some support extended into the late 1950s, focal infection vanished as the primary explanation of chronic, systemic diseases, and the theory was generally abandoned in the 1950s.

== Revival and evolution (1990s–2010s) ==
Despite the general theory's demise, focal infection remained a formal, if rare, diagnosis, as in idiopathic scrotal gangrene and angioneurotic edema. Meanwhile, by way of continuing case reports claiming cures of chronic diseases like arthritis after extraction of infected or root-filled teeth, and despite lack of scientific evidence, "dental focal infection theory never died". In fact, severe endodontic disease resembles classic focal infection theory. In 1986, it was noted that, "in spite of a decline in recognition of the focal-infection theory, the association of decayed teeth with systemic disease is taken very seriously". Eventually, the theory of focal infection drew reconsideration. Conversely, attribution of endocarditis to dentistry has entered doubt via case-control study, as the species usually involved is present throughout the human body.

=== Stealth pathogens ===
With the 1950s introduction of antibiotics, attempts to explain unexplained diseases via bacterial etiology seemed all the more unlikely. By the 1970s, however, it was established that antibiotics could trigger bacteria switch to their L phase. Eluding detection by traditional methods of medical microbiology, bacterial L forms and the similar mycoplasma—and, later, viruses—became the entities expected in the theory of focal infection. Yet until the 1980s, such researchers were scarce, largely due to scarce funding for such investigations.

Despite the limited funding, research established that L forms can adhere to red blood cells and thereby disseminate from foci within internal organs such as the spleen, or from oral tissues and the intestines, especially during dysbiosis. Perhaps some of Weston Price's identified "toxins" in endodontically treated teeth were L forms, thought nonexistent by bacteriologists of his time and widely overlooked into the 21st century. Apparently, dental infections, including by uncultured or cryptic microorganisms, contribute to systemic diseases.

=== Periodontal medicine ===
At the 1990s' emergence of epidemiological associations between dental infections and systemic diseases, American dentistry scholars have been cautious, some seeking successful intervention to confirm causality. Some American sources emphasized epidemiology's inability to determine causality, categorized the phenomena as progressive invasion of local tissues, and distinguished that from focal infection theory—which they assert was evaluated and disproved by the 1940s. Others have found focal infection theory's scientific evidence still slim, but have conceded that evolving science might establish it. Yet select American authors affirm the return of a modest theory of focal infection.

European sources find it more certain that dental infections drive systemic diseases, at least by driving systemic inflammation, and probably, among other immunologic mechanisms, by molecular mimicry resulting in antigenic crossreaction with host biomolecules, while some seemingly find progressive invasion of local tissues compatible with focal infection theory. Acknowledging that beyond epidemiological associations, successful intervention is needed to establish causality, they emphasize that biological explanation is needed atop both, and the biological aspect is thoroughly established already, such that general healthcare, as for cardiovascular disease, must address prevalent periodontal disease, a stance matched in Indian literature. Thus, there has emerged the concept periodontal medicine.

=== Dental controversies ===
During the 1980s, dentist Hal Huggins, sparking severe controversy, spawned biological dentistry, which claims that conventional tooth extraction routinely leaves within the tooth socket the periodontal ligament that often becomes gangrenous, then, forming a jawbone cavitation seeping infectious and toxic material. Sometimes forming elsewhere in bones after injury or ischemia, jawbone cavitations are recognized as foci also in osteopathy and in alternative medicine, but conventional dentists generally conclude them nonexistent. Although the International Academy of Oral Medicine & Toxicology claims that the scientific evidence establishing existence of jawbone cavitations is overwhelming and even published in textbooks, the diagnosis and related treatment remain controversial, and allegations of quackery persist.

Huggins and many biological dentists also espouse Weston Price's findings on endodontically treated teeth routinely being foci of infection, although these dentists have been accused of quackery. Conventional belief is that microorganisms within inaccessible regions of a tooth's roots are rendered harmless once entrapped by the filling material, although little evidence supports this. A H Rogers in 1976 and E H Ehrmann in 1977 had dismissed any relation between endodontics and focal infection. At dentist George Meinig's 1994 book, Root Canal Cover-Up, discussing researches of Rosenow and of Price, some dentistry scholars reasserted that the claims were evaluated and disproved by the 1940s. Yet Meinig was but one of at least three authors who in the early 1990s independently renewed the concern.

Boyd Haley and Curt Pendergrass reporting finding especially high levels of bacterial toxins in root-filled teeth. Although such possibility appears especially likely amid compromised immunity—as in individuals cirrhotic, asplenic, elderly, rheumatoid arthritic, or using steroid drugs—there remained a lack of carefully controlled studies definitely establishing adverse systemic effects. Conversely, some if few studies have investigated effects of systemic disease on root-canal therapy's outcomes, which tend to worsen with poor glycemic control, perhaps via impaired immune response, a factor largely ignored until recently, but now recognized as important. Still, even by 2010, "the potential association between systemic health and root canal therapy has been strongly disputed by dental governing bodies and there remains little evidence to substantiate the claims".

The traditional root-filling material is gutta-percha, whereas a new material, Biocalex, drew initial optimism even in alternative dentistry, but Biocalex-filled teeth were later reported by Boyd Haley to likewise seep toxic byproducts of anaerobic bacterial metabolism. Seeking to sterilize the tooth interior, some dentists, both alternative and conventional, have applied laser technology. Although endodontic therapy can fail and eventually often does, dentistry scholars maintain that it can be performed without creating focal infections. And even by 2010, molecular methods had rendered no consensus reports of bacteremia traced to asymptomatic endodontic infection. In any event, the predominant view is that shunning endodonthic therapy or routinely extracting endodontically treated teeth to treat or prevent systemic diseases remains unscientific and misguided.
