= 1915 typhus and relapsing fever epidemic in Serbia =

Epidemic

In the early stages of the First World War, Serbia suffered an epidemic of typhus and relapsing fever. The epidemic first appeared in the late autumn of 1914, after the second Austrian offensive.

Flora Sandes, who started as a volunteer British nurse, recalled the conditions at the hospital in Kragujevac and meeting Dr. Sondermajer for the first time:

The hospital, on the outskirts of Kragujevac, was overflowing with patients, both Serbs and POWs. Surgeon Dr. Roman Sondermeyer, the immaculately dressed head of the Military Medical Service of the Serbian army, stepped forward smartly to meet us (...) "Twelve hundred patients, two surgeons, eight nurses, and some five hospital orderlies!" wrote Emily of her shock upon realising how many patients there were and how few staff

== British Military Sanitary Committee to Serbia ==
In 1915, the British military doctor William Hunter headed the British Military Sanitary Committee to Serbia tasked with stopping the epidemic. The epidemic was stopped by June 1915 by introduction of several movement restriction measures and by introduction of two new disinfection methods, the "railway van disinfector", and the "barrel disinfector" now known as the Serbian barrel.

In 1920, Hunter published a detailed account on the epidemic in the Proceedings of the Royal Society of Medicine.
