= Serbian barrel =

Device used for sterilizing clothes

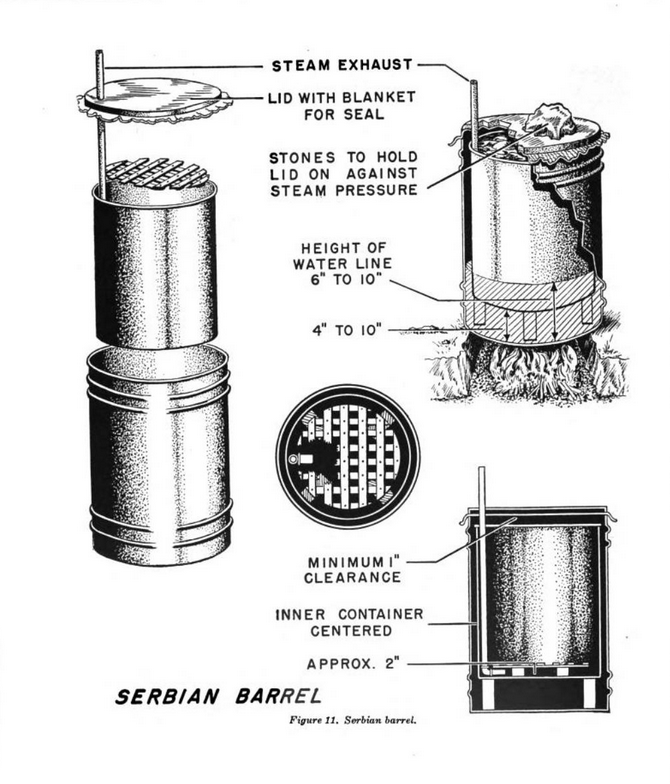
Diagram of Serbian barrel disinfection device

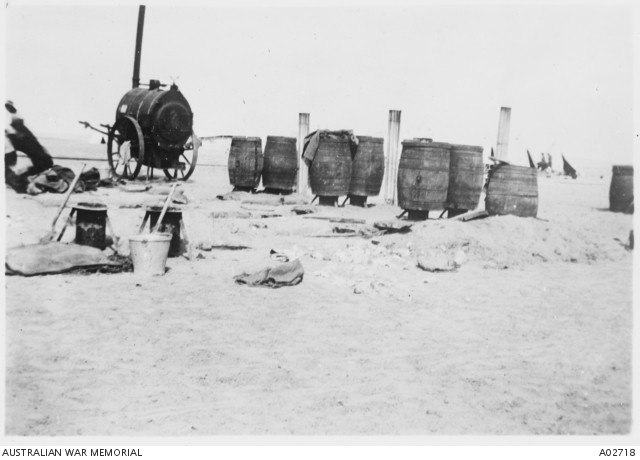
Serbian barrel delousers, used in 1916 by the 2nd Australian Sanitary Section to kill lice in uniforms, blankets and so on.

A Serbian barrel is a sterilization device used for sterilizing clothes. It consists of a wooden or metal barrel or other container which is then heated to disinfect items hung inside it by moist heat sterilization.

The Serbian barrel was pioneered by the British surgeon William Hunter during the 1915 typhus and relapsing fever epidemic in Serbia.
