= Lane baronets =

Extinct baronetcy in the Baronetage of the United Kingdom

The Lane Baronetcy of Tulske, Roscommon was created in the Baronetage of Ireland 9 February 1661 for Richard Lane.

The Lane Baronetcy, of Cavendish Square in the County of London, was created in the Baronetage of the United Kingdom on 19 June 1913 for Arbuthnot-Lane.

== Lane baronets of Tulske, Roscommon (1661) ==
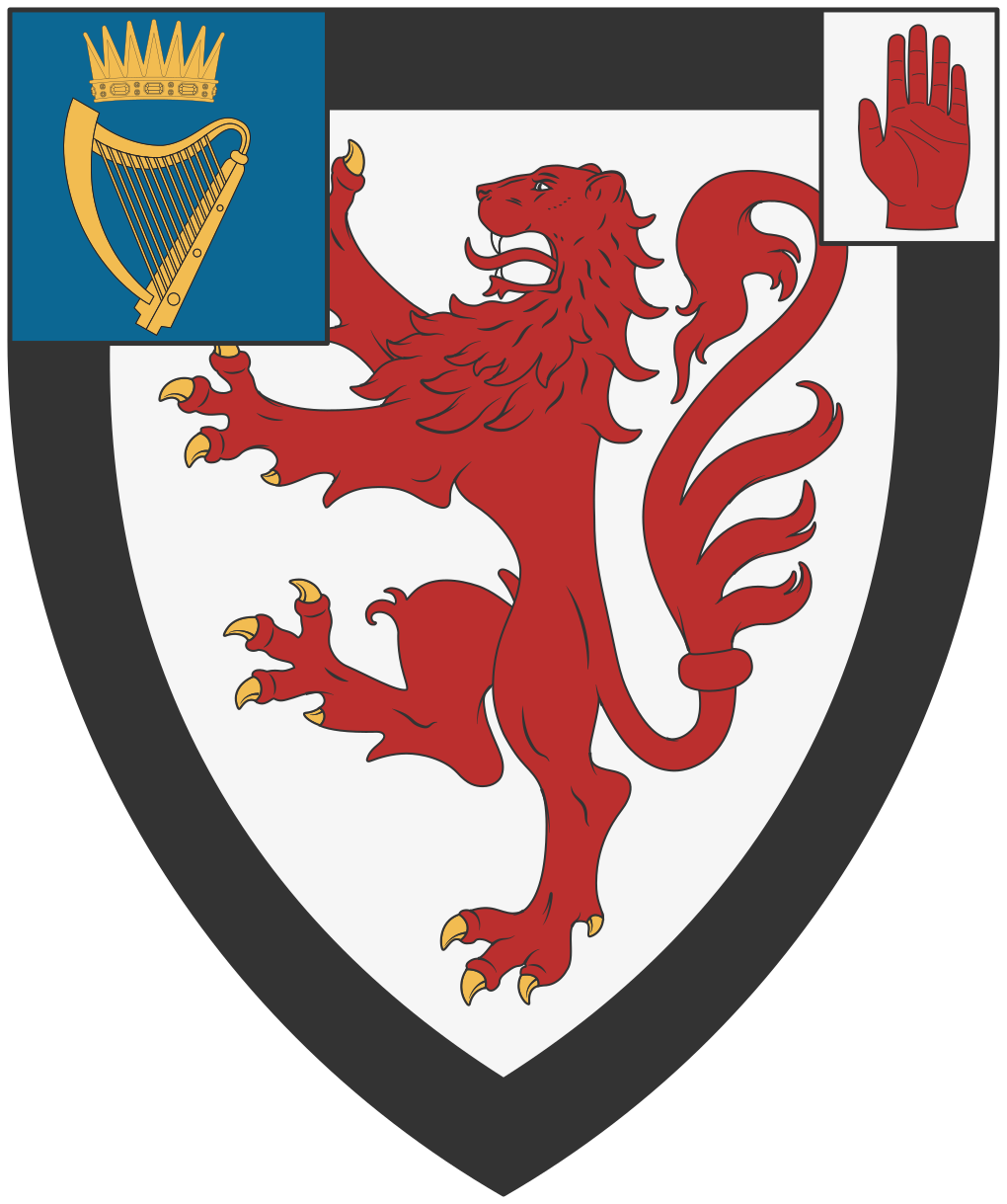

- Sir Richard Lane, 1st Baronet (died 5 October 1668)
- George Lane, 1st Viscount Lanesborough (c. 1620–1683), created Viscount Lanesborough in 1676
- James Lane, 2nd Viscount Lanesborough

Bell's Name Act 1738
- Act of Parliament
- Parliament of Great Britain
- Long title: An Act to enable John Bell Esquire and his Issue to take and use the Surname of Lane, and the Arms of James Lord Viscount Lanesborough, deceased, pursuant to his Will.
- Citation: 12 Geo. 2. c. 33 Pr.
- Territorial extent: Great Britain

Dates
- Royal assent: 13 June 1739
- Commencement: 1 February 1739 (Note: Start of session.)

Status: Current legislation

On James Lane's death, the baronetcy became extinct, and his estate passed to his great-nephew John Bell—the only grandson of his eldest sister Mary—who then changed his surname, by a private act of Parliament, Bell's Name Act 1738 (12 Geo. 2. c. 33 Pr.), to Lane as a condition of the inheritance, thereby becoming John Bell Lane.

== Lane baronets, of Cavendish Square (1913) ==
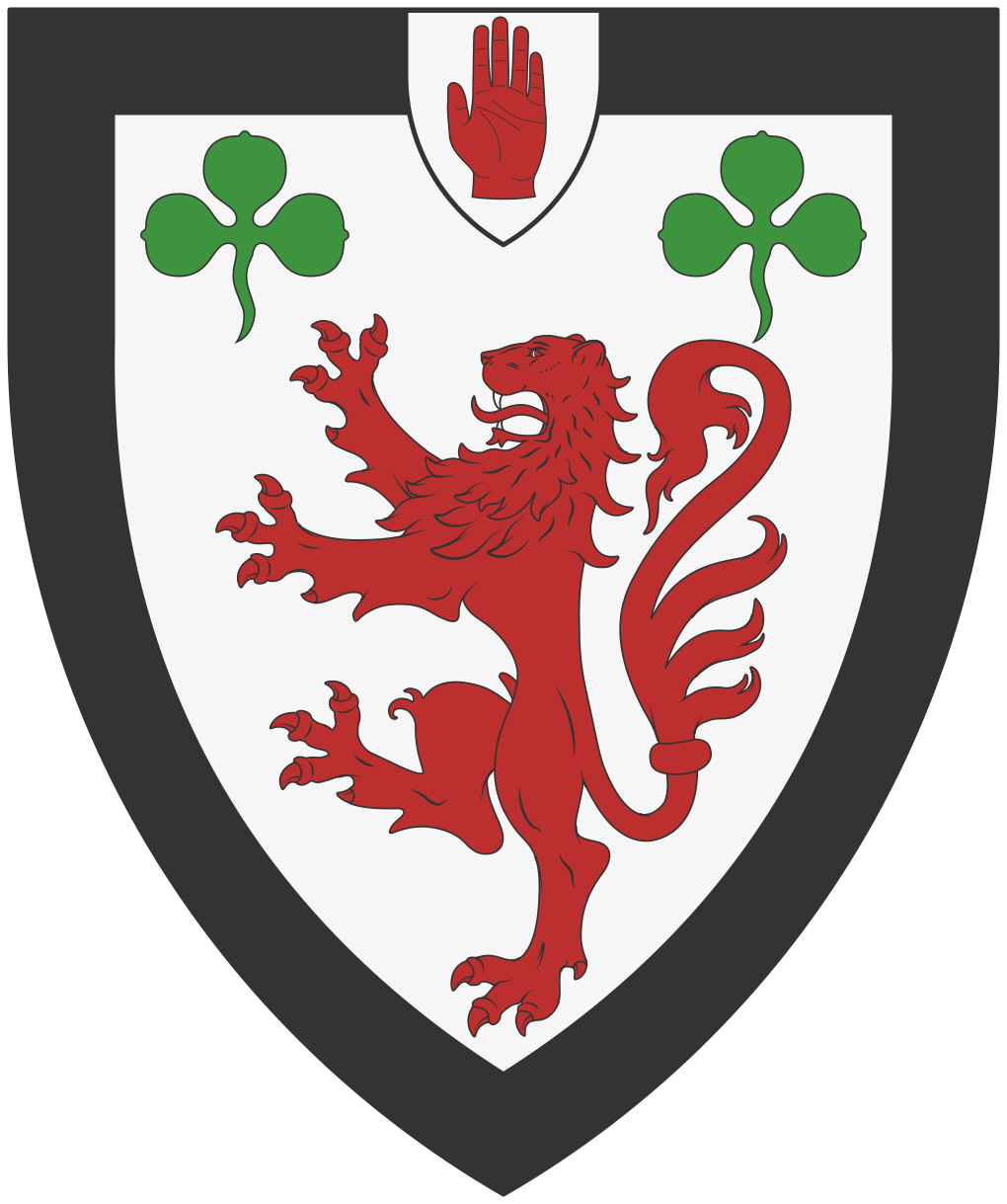

- Sir William Arbuthnot Lane, 1st Baronet (1856–1943)
- Sir William Arbuthnot Lane, 2nd Baronet (7 June 1897–1972). He attended Winchester College, worked in a field hospital in France in World War I, and then joined the RFC. He had his own pharmaceutical Company, Kaylene Ltd, founded in 1928. He joined the Special Constabulary in 1926 and between 1951 and 1958 he was Commandant in Chief of the Specials. He was appointed a CBE. He married in Marylebone 29 May 1937, Fritzi Szamvald Markus (born 25 August 1907, died Westminster 2 Dec 1976). He had one daughter. On his death, the baronetcy became extinct.

== Bibliography ==
- Leigh Rayment's list of baronets
- Burke's Peerage & Baronetage. 1970.
- Debrett's Peerage & Baronetage. 1970.
- Who's Who. 1970.
