= Sir William Arbuthnot Lane, 1st Baronet =

British surgeon (1856–1943)

Sir William Arbuthnot Lane Bt, CB, FRCS
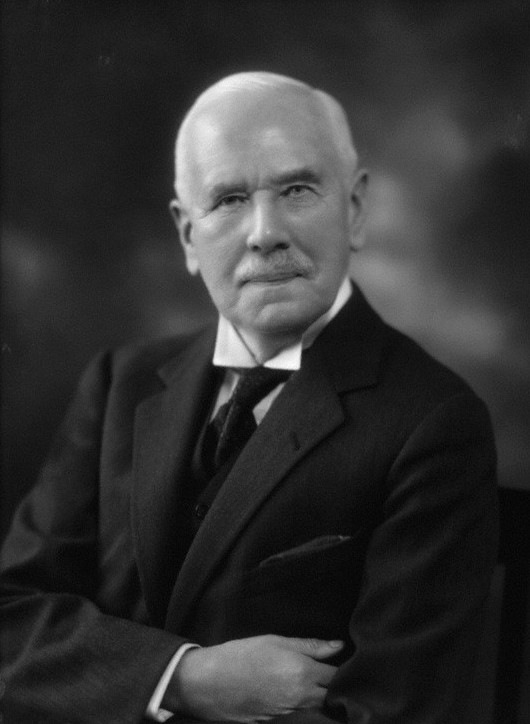
- Lane in 1930
- Born: 4 July 1856; Fort George
- Died: January 16, 1943 (aged 86); Paddington
- Occupations: Surgeon, naturopath

Sir William Arbuthnot Lane, 1st Baronet, CB, FRCS (4 July 1856 – 16 January 1943) was a British surgeon and physician. He mastered orthopaedic, abdominal, and ear, nose and throat surgery, while designing new surgical instruments toward maximal asepsis. He thus introduced the "no-touch technique", and some of his designed instruments remain in use.

Lane pioneered internal fixation of displaced fractures, procedures on cleft palate, and colon resection and colectomy to treat "Lane's disease"—now otherwise termed colonic inertia, which he identified in 1908—which surgeries were controversial but advanced abdominal surgery. During World War I, as an officer with the Royal Army Medical Corps, he organised and opened Queen Mary's Hospital in Sidcup, which pioneered reconstructive surgery. The late-Victorian and Edwardian periods' preeminent surgeon, Lane operated on socialites, politicians, and royalty. Lane thus attained baronetcy in 1913.

In the early 1920s, as an early advocate of dietary prevention of cancer, Lane met medical opposition, resigned from British Medical Association, and founded the New Health Society, the first organisation practising social medicine. Through newspapers and lectures, sometimes drawing large crowds, Lane promoted whole foods, fruits and vegetables, sunshine and exercise: his plan to foster health and longevity via three bowel movements daily. Tracing diverse diseases to modern civilization, he urged the people to return to farmland.

For his New Health, Lane eventually became viewed as a crank. Lane's explanation of the association between constipation and illness as due to autointoxication is generally regarded by gastroenterologists as wholly fictitious, and Lane's earlier surgeries for chronic constipation have been depicted as baseless. Yet constipation remains a major health problem associating with diverse signs and symptoms, including psychological—sometimes still explained as Lane's disease—and total colectomy has been revived since the 1980s as a mainstream treatment, although dietary intervention is now the first line of action.

== Life and career ==
=== Childhood ===
William Arbuthnot Lane was born in 1856 in Fort George near Inverness, Scotland, as the eldest of the eight children of Benjamin Lane, a military surgeon enlisted to the British Empire. William attended schools in eight countries on four continents—Ireland, India, Corfu, Malta, Canada, South Africa, and others—while his family followed the army regiment. Amid his mother's bearing seven children in rapid succession after him, William was often left in the care of military personnel. At age 12, he was sent to boarding school at Stanley House School, Bridge of Allan in Scotland.

=== Education ===
In 1872, his father arranged for him, age 16, to study medicine at Guy's Hospital. Apparently shy and appearing young even for his age, William initially had some troubles with fellow students, but they rapidly recognized his exceptional abilities. Soon, he was persuaded to switch to surgery, however, a surer career than medicine. Later, he received the degrees bachelor of medicine and master of surgery from the University of London.

=== Career ===
In 1877, at age 21, he qualified as a member of the Royal College of Surgeons, and began to practise in Chelsea, London, at the Victoria Hospital for Children. In 1883, Lane became a Fellow of Royal College of Surgeons and joined Great Ormond Street Hospital, where he was consultant until 1916. In 1888, at age 32, Lane returned to Guy's Hospital as anatomy demonstrator and assistant surgeon, and remained with Guy's for most of his career.

Lane became especially known for internal fixation of displaced fractures, neonatal repair of cleft palate, and developing colectomy, which, although highly controversial and opposed by most surgical peers, notably advanced abdominal surgery. Lane collaborated with Down Brothers to design a number of surgical instruments, including screw driver, periosteal elevator, tissue forceps, intestinal anastomosis clamp, bone-holding forceps, and osteotome. For his surgery on British royalty, he was awarded baronetcy in 1913.

Lane became an officer in Royal Army Medical Corps, head of army surgery, during World War I (1914–18). For this work as consulting surgeon in Aldershot at the Cambridge Military Hospital and for opening Queen Mary's Hospital in Sidcup—where, overcoming government resistance to fund it, he gave Harold Gillies a ward where Gillies pioneered reconstructive surgery—Lane was appointed Companion of The Most Honourable Order of the Bath. In 1920, rather soon after returning from wartime service, Lane retired from Guy's Hospital, yet continued private practice out his home office.

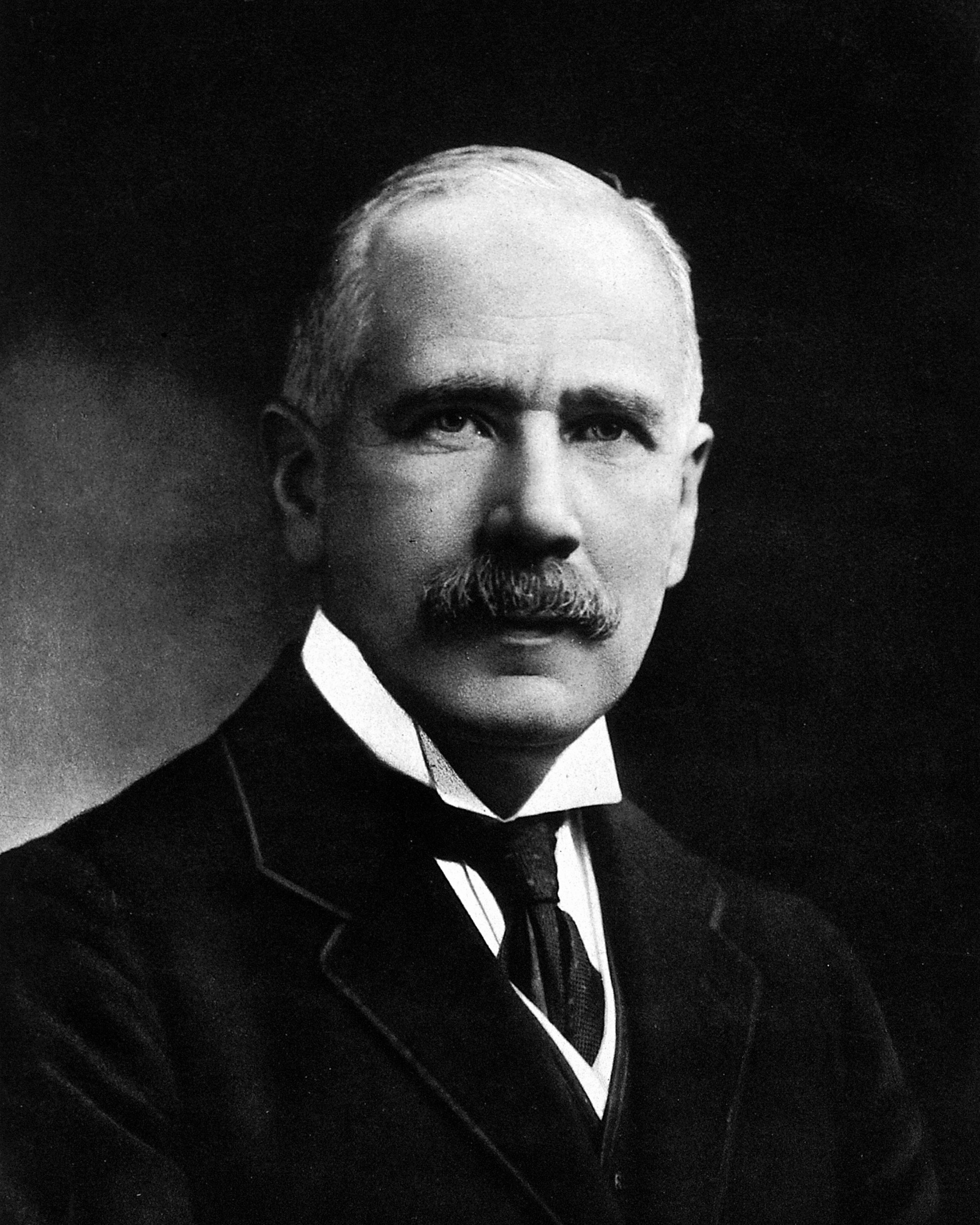
Sir William Arbuthnot Lane, 1st Baronet

=== Writing ===
He first published in 1883, seven years after starting his surgery career. He published about 189 articles, including 72 on fractures, 16 on harelip and cleft palate, many others on other subjects, and, after year 1903, 89 articles directly on chronic intestinal stasis—which, like many Victorians, Lane experienced. He wrote several books, including one on cleft palate, one on surgery for chronic intestinal stasis, and one on New Health. Not for print, his autobiography—manuscript dated March 1936, soon before his 80th birthday—was written for family at the urging of his children.

=== Family ===
William's first wife, Charlotte Jane Briscoe—daughter of John Briscoe, himself son of Major Briscoe—bore Irene Briscoe in 1890 and Eileen Caroline in 1893, both in St Olave parish. At age 78, Charlotte Jane died in 1935. Sir Lane's daughter Eileen was married to Nathan Mutch, whose sister was Jane Mutch. In 1935, Sir Lane married Jane Mutch (who died in 1966 at age 82).

=== Image ===
Lane was tall, rather thin, seemingly aged slowly, his reactions were often difficult to discern, and yet he often exhibited strong opinions. It was often said that Lane was George Bernard Shaw's model for the scurrilous surgeon, Cutler Walpole—obsessed with excising the "nuciform sac", said to be nickname for the colon—in Shaw's play The Doctor's Dilemma. Yet the play was nearly surely about Sir Almroth Wright, whom Lane knew well. After Lane's death, Shaw stated that the play was published long before he had ever heard of Lane, but still regarded Lane's bowel surgeries as "monstrous". And the play well suggests the view of Lane as held by many of Lane's contemporaries.

After 1924, abandoning his private medical practice as well as surgery, Lane's public devotion was social medicine and public education on dietary and lifestyle subversion of constipation and promotion of general wellbeing, his New Health. Of diverse interests, Lane traveled frequently, often visiting America, while gaining friends and colleagues internationally. Among his associates and acquaintances were Alexis Carrel, John Benjamin Murphy, Elie Metchnikoff, Sir James Mackenzie, William Worrall Mayo and sons William James Mayo and Charles Horace Mayo of Mayo Clinic fame.

Quotes of Lane by his Guy's Hospital house surgeon and biographer, William E Tanner:

- The man whose first question, after what he considers to be a right course of action has presented itself, is What will people say? is not the man to do anything at all.
- If you get a rude letter, always send a polite one back. It's much better.
- If everyone believes a thing, it is probably untrue!

=== Death ===
He died at his home, 46 Westbourne Terrace, Paddington, London, W2.

== Medical spotlight ==
=== Surgery master ===
By 1886, Lane authored a surgery textbook. In 1889 in America at Johns Hopkins University's medical school, William Halsted, a pioneer of abdominal surgery, introduced surgical gloves, and then contracted Goodyear Rubber Company to manufacture thin ones to preserve hands' tactile sensitivity. In the 1890s, glove use still uncommon, Lane introduced long surgical instruments to keep even gloves off of tissues. In his open reductions and plating of fractured bones, Lane introduced the "no-touch technique". Thus pioneering aseptic surgery, an advance beyond antiseptic surgery, Lane enabled new surgeries previously too dangerous.

Widely renowned, Lane's surgical skill exhibited imperturbable calm at difficulties encountered during the operations. A contemporary noted "the originality of his procedures and the smoothness, ease, and perfection of technic that proclaimed a real master, a master who dared where others quailed and who succeeded where others would have failed without his skill, his precision, and the confidence with which he planned and executed his operations". Although most of Lane's surgical career was attended by controversy, it could not be denied that—with but the possible exception of Sir Frederick Treves—Lane was London's best surgeon as to technique.

=== Internal fixation ===
Only anecdotal reports of using internal fixation to set displaced fractures predate Joseph Lister's 1865 introduction of antiseptic surgery, whereupon Lister reported silver wire on a displaced petellar fracture. Yet even before radiography, Lane had found that conventional setting by manipulation and splints yielded poor outcomes—bone disunion and joint changes or wear in individuals under much physical activity—and Lane started using wires and screws in 1892. Amid the conservative medical community's vehement opposition, Lane's approach was so revolutionary that organizations certifying surgeons sometimes automatically dismissed students able to elaborate on such procedures, as nearly 50% of patients whose closed fractures were opened died by ensuing infections. Yet with not antiseptic, but aseptic, surgical techniques, previously unheard of, Lane forged ahead.

In the meantime, other surgeons' poor results, such as sepsis causing failed union, were sometimes erroneously associated with Lane. The British Medical Association appointed a committee to investigate Lane's practise—and ruled in Lane's favour. Whereas other surgeons would attempt asepsis but lapse, perhaps touching an unsterilized surface, Lane's utterly fastidious protocol was unrelenting. His 1905 book The Operative Treatment of Fractures reported good results. And in 1907, Lane introduced plates, made of steel. (Stainless steel, discovered the next decade, was not widely used in medicine or surgery until much later.) And later, Lane's assertion of frequent disunion via nonsurgical intervention was vindicated by radiography. Altogether, Lane's influence introducing internal fixation rivals and may exceed that of other, early pioneers like Albin Lambotte and later William O'Neill Sherman.

=== Intestinal stasis ===
==== Backdrop ====
At 1886, Russian emigrant Elie Metchnikoff—discoverer of phagocytes mediating innate immunity—was welcomed to Paris by Louis Pasteur with an entire floor at the Pasteur Institute. As did Paul Ehrlich—theorist on antibody mediating acquired immunity—and as did Pasteur, Metchnikoff believed nutrition to influence immunity. Sharing Pasteur's vision of science as a means to combat humankind's woes, Metchnikoff brought France its first yogurt cultures, aiming its probiotic microorganisms to suppress the colon's putrefactive microorganisms allegedly causing toxic seepage, autointoxication. Later the Pasteur Institute's director and a 1908 Nobelist, Metchnikoff viewed the colon as a primitive organ that had stored our wild ancestors' waste for long periods, a survival advantage amid abundant predators, but a liability since civilization had freed humans to excrete without peril. Metchnikoff predicted the colon's evolutionary shrinkage until, allegedly alike the appendix, it became vestigial. Metchnikoff's book La Vie Humaine foresaw a courageous surgeon removing the colon. Lane and Metchnikoff met in Lane's home.

The pioneer British psychiatrist Henry Maudsley asserted much "evidence that organic morbid poisons bred in the organism or in the blood itself may act in the most baneful manner upon the supreme nervous centers. The earliest and mildest mental effect by which a perverted state of blood declares itself is not in the production of positive delusion or incoherence of thought, but in a modification of mental tone", then perhaps "a chronic delusion of some kind", though "its more acute action is to produce more or less active delirium and general incoherence of thought". Famed British surgeon William Hunter incriminated oral sepsis in 1900, and lectured to a Canadian medical faculty in Montreal in 1910. Two years later, Chicago physician Frank Billings termed it focal infection. Within the English-speaking world, the lectures of Hunter and of Billings "ignited the fires of focal infection", whose theory converged with the autointoxication principle.

Since 1875, American medical doctor John Harvey Kellogg in Battle Creek, Michigan, at his huge sanitarium—advertised as "University of Health", staffing some 800 to 1 000, and yearly receiving several thousand patients, including US Presidents and celebrities—had battled degeneration and disease by fending off bowel sepsis. In the early 20th century, rebuking alleged "health faddists" like Kellogg and Sylvester Graham, American physicians who embraced focal infection theory cast themselves in the German tradition of "scientific medicine". Kellogg argued that German researchers ostensibly repudiated the autointoxication principle, but, by using different terminology, supported it circuitously. Since French pathologist Charles Jacques Bouchard, in his 1887 book, coined the term autointoxication, French researchers had investigated and openly advocated the principle, already presaged by multiple researchers in Europe and America. Meanwhile, British surgeons still knife-happy, Hunter warned of "intestinal stasis" impairing mental stability, and called for "surgical bacteriology".

==== Lane ====
In 1908, Lane reported a syndrome of severe chronic constipation, often with dysfunction of pelvic muscles and obstructed defecation—invariably with psychological dysfunction, impairing quality of life, but affecting mostly women—a syndrome soon termed Lane disease, yet now otherwise termed slow transit constipationas well as colonic inertia. That same year, Lane treated it by surgery. The following year, Lane's book The Operative Treatment of Chronic Constipation was published in London. Lane began with colon bypass, and then, at insufficient improvements, performed total colectomy. Famed for an appendectomy saving England's monarch, Lane warned of "chronic intestinal stasis"—its "flooding of the circulation with filthy material", thus autointoxication—warnings taken seriously by the public.

Such views on the colon, constipation, and autointoxication were standard in the medical profession, yet disagreement raged over the proper explanation and the proper intervention, and so controversy trailed Lane's surgeries. Apparently, Lane had had trouble publishing in the British Medical Journal and in The Lancet his first articles on chronic intestinal stasis. Some who endorsed the autointoxication principle interpreted constipation to have a role in it, but a role "obscure", as some thought the drying of fecal matter to diminish putrefaction, but the stasis of the small bowel, rather, to be the especial source of autointoxication. In any case, most surgeons opposed Lane's operating on constipation.

The Royal Society of Medicine called a 1913 meeting, but, despite some 60 synonyms circulating for autointoxication from varying perspectives, suggested neutrality by choosing none and introducing a new term, alimentary toxæmia. Several authors, including Lane, presented papers, whereupon some two dozen responded from April to May. There, "chronic intestinal stasis received its deathblow", when a Fellow's severely antagonistic speech, apparently influencing the course of Lane's career, preempted Lane's opening a surgery school. World War I broke out in 1914, diverting the attention of Lane, newly head of army surgery. Returning from war service, Lane retired from Guy's Hospital in 1920, and continued in private practice. From then onward, Lane wrote almost only on chronic intestinal stasis. Meanwhile, focal infection theory—a primary means of interpreting the autointoxication principle—was "coming of age".

In 1916, Henry Cotton in America had embraced focal infection theory with unmatched zeal, became the first to apply it to psychiatry, and rapidly rose to international fame for prescribing removal of dentition, sex glands, and internal organs—most controversially the colon—to treat schizophrenia and manic depression, while claiming up to some 80% cure rate, seemingly worth the 30% death rate. (Soon, independent investigators ventured to Cotton's facility and performed, it seems, psychiatry's first two controlled clinical trials, finding Cotton's claims false.) In 1923, on his European lecture tour, Cotton arrived in Britain, where he learned from Lane an improved surgical technique—as well as a new, far less radical surgical procedure. In autumn 1923, Lane had performed the first 19 "pericolic membranotomies", putatively releasing intestinal adhesions. Wherever apparently possible, Lane replaced colon bypass and colectomy with pericolic membranotomy.

=== New Health ===
In the early 1920s, Lane began advocating cancer prevention through diet, but, thereby drawing conflict with the British Medical Association, resigned from the association in 1924, renouncing his lucrative private medical and surgical practice, some 10 000 pounds a year. In 1925, Lane founded the New Health Society, the first organised body for social medicine, which German pathologist and statesman Rudolf Virchow had pioneered in late 19th century to undo disease's sociopolitical causes. The term New Health largely referred to nonsurgical healthcare against constipation. With advertising by physicians being forbidden, Lane averted disciplining by the General Medical Council by having his name deleted from the Medical Register. Lane then promoted his views on healthful lifestyle and nutrition, including return to farmland, ample sunlight exposure, ample exercise, greater intake of whole foods, particularly grains, vegetables, and fruits, and nutritional yeast for B vitamins—Lane's plan to foster defecation thrice daily, cancer prevention, general health, and longevity. Meanwhile, colectomy for constipation was abandoned amid low success rates but high complication rates.

New Health Society sought to transform the "rapidly degenerating community" into a "nation composed of healthy, vigorous members". Blending a utopian vision, progressive gender ideology, social darwinist rhetoric, and eugenic rationales—which, altogether, reflected the period's prevailing framework—New Health Society's view, not hereditarian, however, depicted humankind's regeneration as pivoting on health education. Sidestepping issues of poverty and inequality, it took health as a personal responsibility and duty of citizenship, whereby health and happiness were attainable by all who consumed a high-fibre diet, exercised, and got ample sunshine, while using birth control and reforming men's dress. Although embracing modern science, technology, and mass media, New Health Society suggested valorisation of "native" culture, and found the bowels central to health, while constipation anchored many of civilisation's ills. Lane said that his lecture in Oldham, Lancashire, was "packed by three thousand or more people", and "that many people had to be carried out fainting, while outside mounted policemen were kept busy holding back and controlling the crowd who wished to force their way into the hall".

== Legacy ==
Seven years before his 1943 death, Lane's autobiography explained himself as a man "acting upon the repeated request of his children that I should write for them a rough sketch of my life", although "it can be of no interest to others". Rather, two of his former house surgeons at Guy's Hospital—first W. E. Tanner and later T. B. Layton—would borrow from it to author biographies on Lane. By then, however, consensus had formed that Lane's surgeries to treat constipation had been misguided, and perhaps even Lane himself had concluded so. By 1982, colectomy for constipation was declared "clinically futile". And yet, in Lane's lifetime, it was instead his New Health, including his claims that modern society was ruining health, whereby Lane became, at last, viewed as a crank.

=== Autointoxication ===
The autointoxication principle became an alleged myth scientifically discredited, while interventions to subvert it were deemed quackery. Lane's rationale and his era's very notion of autointoxication have been depicted as wholly unfounded and irrational or "illogical," due to a pervasive psychological effect of toilet training or a figment of the Victorian era's culture. Yet by the late 1990s, the autointoxication concept and thereby colon cleansing was being renewed in alternative healthcare, allegedly upon a fictitious basis. Combating alleged myths, some gastroenterologists asserted that "no evidence" supports the autointoxication concept that toxins are absorbed from waste in the large intestine.

In basic research, if freed from its simplistic reduction to constipation, the autointoxication principle has now been substantially supported as an independent mechanism whereby gastrointestinal microorganisms contain or produce toxins exhibiting systemic effects—as by transmigration into circulation and driving systemic inflammation—effects that include the psychological. Apparent instances of autointoxication associate not merely with constipation, however, but principally with alternating constipation and diarrhea, as Lane had noted in his 1908 paper that described constipation as but the earlier, underlying etiological factor whereby autointoxication may incite diarrhea, too.

=== Constipation ===
There is much disagreement over the meaning of constipation, far overreported by the general public versus conventional medical criteria—under two defecations per week. Despite the general public's remaining prevalence of belief that maintaining good health requires defecation at least daily, many constipated individuals apparently are quite healthy—some even defecating under once a week—whereas others who defecate daily are unhealthy.

Still, constipation remains a "major health problem". Gastroenterologists attribute chronic constipation's associated signs and symptoms to slow colon transit, to irritable bowel syndrome, to pelvic floor dysfunction—apparently a cause of refractory constipation in adolescents, too—or to obstructed defecation, which along with slow colon transit have remained incompletely understood. Individuals have varied complaints and try many remedies for signs and symptoms.

Treating constipation, gastroenterologists' first line of intervention is now dietary—whole foods, principally vegetables, fruits, and grains—or fiber supplements. Meanwhile, roles for lifestyle—exercise, mindset, socioeconomic status—have been recognized, although some gastroenterologists as recently as 2012 have claimed that there is "no evidence" supporting a role for exercise. Some 15% to 30% of constipation patients exhibit slow colon transit, which laxatives and medical drugs do not amend. Thus, refractory constipation is sometimes treated surgically reportedly successfully, but sometimes successfully, or even worsening abdominal pain.

=== Lane disease ===
The syndrome that Lane reported in 1908, "Lane disease" or "Arbuthnot Lane disease", is now usually termed by gastroenterologists either slow transit constipation or slow colon transit or colonic inertia, exhibited by some 15% to 30% of constipation patients. By 1985, Lane's early article on surgical treatment of chronic constipation had become a classic, while physiologic testing and more accurate patient selection renewed interest in total colectomy with ileorectal anastomosis—that is, removing the entire large intestine and joining the small intestine's outlet to the rectum—to treat colonic inertia, Lane disease. By now, gastroenterology's accepted view is that, although few patients meet the selection criteria, surgery ought to be offered as a treatment option for severe chronic constipation. Selection criteria ought to be extremely stringent, including multiple confirmation of slow colon transit by physiologic testing, and further medical, psychological, and psychosocial evaluations, with patients understanding that colectomy might not improve the condition and might even worsen abdominal pain.

=== Relevance ===
Willie Lane was among the last surgeons of an era where one could master three specialties—orthopaedic, abdominal, and ear nose and throat—and some of his designed surgical instruments are still used today. Lane's introduction of the "no-touch technique", which permitted aseptic surgery, is perhaps his greatest contribution to surgery. Even in the 21st century, particular descriptions by Lane "should be required reading by orthopaedic surgeons". Lane's life ought to interest historians of medicine as well as believers in holistic medicine. In his time, some thought Lane a genius, while others disagreed, including Sir Arthur Keith who claimed him not clever but carried by faith. In any event, Lane can be characterised as "a crusader, a perfectionist, and an extraordinarily talented surgeon".

== Footnotes ==
Baronetage of the United Kingdom
New creation	Baronet (of Cavendish Square); 1913–43	Succeeded by William Arbuthnot Lane
