= George Hughes Kirby =

American physician (1875–1935)

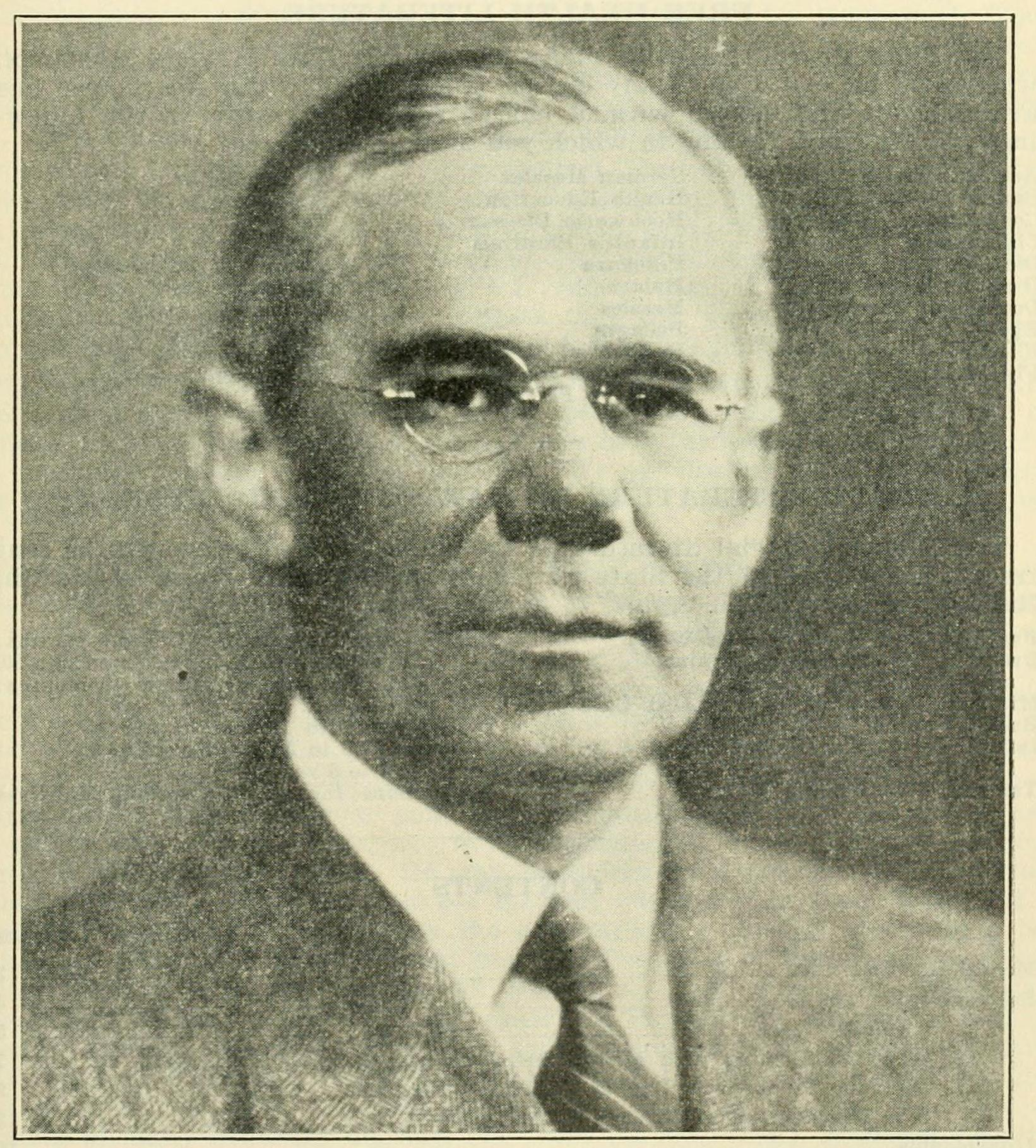
- Portrait of George Hughes Kirby
- Born: 1875; Goldsboro, North Carolina, U.S.
- Died: 1935 (aged 59–60); New Hampshire, U.S.
- Education: University of North Carolina (B.A.); Long Island College Hospital (M.D.)
- Occupations: Military officer; educator
- Medical career
- Profession: physician and psychiatrist
- Field: psychiatry
- Institutions: New York Neurological Society; American Neurological Association; American Psychopathological Association; American Psychiatric Association; New York Society for Clinical Psychiatry; New York Academy of Medicine
- Notable works: classification of psychoses
- Awards: University of North Carolina honored him with an L.L.D. in 1929.
- Military career
- Allegiance: United States
- Branch: United States Army
- Rank: Major
- Conflicts: World War I

George Hughes Kirby (1875–1935) was an American physician and psychiatrist, administrator, and educator, who contributed to the advancement of psychiatry in the United States.

Kirby was born in Goldsboro, North Carolina, the son of a physician who was superintendent of the state mental hospital in Goldsboro. He attended the public schools of Goldsboro, then enrolled in the University of North Carolina, earned his nomination to Phi Beta Kappa, and graduated with a B.A. in 1896. His medical training was at the Long Island College Hospital in New York, and he earned his M.D. in 1899. He worked under Adolf Meyer at the Worcester State Hospital in Massachusetts. In 1902, when Meyer became director of the New York State Psychiatric Institute, located on Wards Island, Kirby went with him and was hired at the Manhattan State Hospital. In 1908, Kirby was appointed director of Clinical Psychiatry at the Manhattan State Hospital. During his years with Meyer, Kirby went to Germany and studied with Emil Kraepelin, professor of clinical psychiatry at the Ludwig-Maximilians-Universität München.

While at the Manhattan State Hospital, Kirby developed a classification of psychoses which was expanded as a statistical guide for use in the New York State mental hospitals. The American Psychiatric Association adopted Kirby's classification. He also developed staff education courses for use in state mental hospitals.

In 1917, the New York State Hospital Commission appointed Kirby as medical inspector, but after four months he left this position to assume the directorship of the New York State Psychiatric Institute when Meyer left. Kirby was an active participant in planning the move of the New York State Psychiatric Institute from Wards Island to the Columbia University Medical Center and he was involved in the construction of the new building. He held the post of director until he retired in 1931.

During World War I, Kirby was a Major in the U.S. Army and commanded the hospital established in New York City to care for mentally disabled soldiers. The U.S. Public Health Service appointed him as a consultant. Kirby served as a professor of psychiatry at several medical schools in New York: from 1914 to 1919, he was Adjunct Professor of Mental Diseases at New York University and Bellevue Medical College; from 1917 to 1932, he was professor of psychiatry at Cornell University Medical College; and from 1927 to 1932 he was professor of psychiatry at the College of Physicians and Surgeons at Columbia University.

Kirby played an active role in numerous professional organizations: the New York Neurological Society (president), the American Neurological Association, the American Psychopathological Association, the American Psychiatric Association (president, 1933–34), the New York Society for Clinical Psychiatry, the New York Academy of Medicine, and the board of directors of the National Committee for Mental Hygiene. He served on numerous editorial boards, including those of the American Journal of Psychiatry and Psychiatric Quarterly. The University of North Carolina honored him with an LL.D. in 1929.

Kirby died in 1935 while on vacation in New Hampshire.

== Notable publications ==
- Kirby, George H. "The Psychiatric Clinic at Munich, with Notes on Some Clinical Psychological Methods", The Medical Record (1906): 990-992.
- Kirby, George H. "The Anxiety Psychoses", The Boston Medical and Surgical Journal (1908): 159.
- Kirby, George H. "Syphilis and Insanity", Proceedings of the Mental Hygiene Conference and Exhibit. (1912): 62-70.
- Kirby, George H. "A Study in Race Psychopathology", Studies in Psychiatry (1912): 9-15.
- Kirby, George H. "Dementia Præcox Deteriorations without Trends", State Hospital Bulletin (1912-1913): 372-383.
- Kirby, George H. "The Catatonic Syndrome and its Relation to Manic-Depressive Insanity", Journal of Nervous & Mental Disease (1913): 694-704.
- Kirby, George H. "Alcoholic Hallucinosis, with Special Reference to Prognosis and Relation to other Psychoses", Psychiatric Bulletin of the New York State Hospitals (1916): 353-367.
- Hoch, August, and George H. Kirby. "A Clinical Study of Psychoses Characterized by Distressed Perplexity", Archives of Neurology and Psychiatry (1919): 415-458.
- Kirby, George H. The Reproductive Glands and Mental Disorder with Special Reference to Dementia Præcox", State Hospitals Quarterly (1920-1921): 147-158.
- Kirby, George H. "Some Problems of the Mental Reaction Types Associated with Organic Brain Disease", State Hospitals Quarterly (1920-1921): 467-480.
- Kirby, George H. "Alcohol and Syphilis as Causes of Mental Disease", The Journal of the American Medical Association (1921): 1062-1066.
- Kirby, George H. "Incidence of Alcoholic and Syphilitic Psychoses", Journal of Nervous & Mental Disease (1921): 237-240.
- Kirby, George H. Guide for History Taking and Clinical Examination of Psychiatric Cases. Albany: New York State Hospital Commission, 1921.
- Kirby, George H., and T.K. Davis. "Psychiatric Aspects of Epidemic Encephalitis", Archives of Neurology and Psychiatry (1921): 491-555.
- Kopeloff, N. and George H. Kirby. "Focal Infection and Mental Disease", American Journal of Psychiatry (1923-1924): 149-197.
- Bunker, H.A., and George H. Kirby. "Treatment of General Paralysis by Inoculation with Malaria: A First Report", The Journal of the American Medical Association (1925): 563-568.
- Bunker, H.A., and George H. Kirby. "The Height and Duration of Fever in Relation to the Clinical Outcome in the Treatment of General Paresis with Malaria", Medical Journal and Record (1925): 413-415.
- Kirby, George H. "The Treatment of General Paralysis, with Special Reference to Tryparsamide and Malaria Treatment", State Hospital Quarterly (1925-1926): 559-586.
- Kirby, George H., and H.A. Bunker. "Types of Therapeutic Response Observed in the Malaria Treatment of General Paralysis", American Journal of Psychiatry (1926-1927): 205-226.
- Kirby, George H., and L.E. Hinsie. "Tryparsamide Treatment of General Paralysis", State Hospital Quarterly (1926-1927): 53-75.
- Bunker, H.A., and George H. Kirby. "The Place of Malaria in the Treatment of General Paralysis: A Survey of 4½ Years' Experience in the Use of this Mode of Therapy", Bulletin of the New York Academy of Medicine (1928): 307-322.
- Bunker, H.A., and George H. Kirby. "The Treatment of General Paralysis by Inoculation with Malaria: Fourth-year Results", The Journal of the American Medical Association (1928): 760-762.
- Kopeloff, N. and George H. Kirby. "The Relation of Focal Infection to Mental Disease", The Journal of Mental Science (1929): 267-270.
- Kirby, George H. "Presidential Address: Modern Psychiatry and Mental Healing", American Journal of Psychiatry (1934): 1-18.
