= William Hunter (surgeon) =

British surgeon

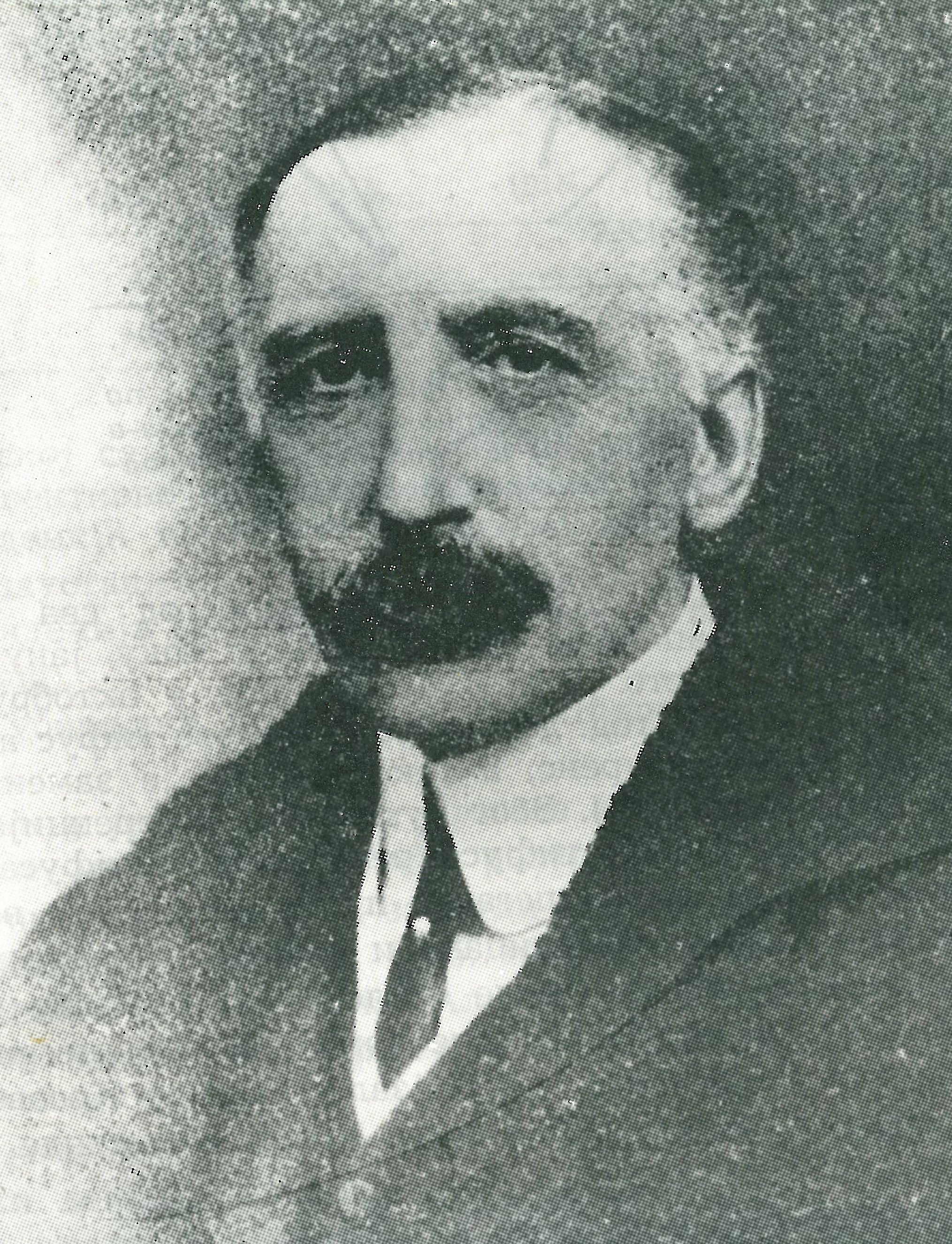
- Born: 1 June 1861; Ballantrae in Ayrshire, Scotland
- Died: 13 January 1937 (aged 75); London
- Occupations: Surgeon, Medical Researcher, Senior Physician of London Fever Hospital
- Spouse(s): Beatrice Fielden, married 1894

William Hunter CB FRSE (1 June 1861 – 13 January 1937) was a British surgeon known primarily for his theories on oral sepsis, one of the inspirations for the Henry Cotton theory of focal sepsis which led to the increased number of tooth extractions and tonsillectomies in the 1910s and 20s (under the presumption that hidden sepsis could lead to a wider health decline in individuals). By the 1930s, this view had fallen out of favor, but not until after thousands of surgeries had been performed.

== Life ==
Hunter was born on 1 June 1861 in Ballantrae in Ayrshire, the son of Robert Hunter of Birkenhead. He was educated at Ayr Academy.

He studied medicine at Edinburgh University graduating MB ChM in 1883. He received his doctorate (MD) in 1886 and beginning work in Edinburgh's Western Infirmary. He then did further postgraduate studies in Leipzig, Cambridge, Vienna and Strasbourg. In 1887 he was elected a Fellow of the Royal Society of Edinburgh. His proposers were William Rutherford, Sir William Turner, Sir Thomas Richard Fraser and William Smith Greenfield.

He moved to London in the late 19th century and became a physician at the London Fever Hospital and at Charing Cross Hospital.

During the First World War he initially served as a colonel in the Royal Army Medical Corps then was created president of the advisory committee on health to the East Mediterranean and Mesopotamian Expeditionary Force and consultant to the Eastern Command. In 1916 he was created a Commander of the Order of the Bath (CB) and created a Grand Officer of the Serbian Order of St. Sava.

Edinburgh University awarded him an honorary doctorate (LLD) in 1927 along with Sir Berkeley Moynihan during a meeting of the Royal Medico-Psychological Association, at which Hunter gave a lengthy address comparing the work of Joseph Lister who had been born 100 years previously, and the work of the American doctor Henry Cotton, praising the latter as a pioneer of surgical interventions in mental disorder, an idea that Hunter had speculated on but with which Cotton had followed through experimentally. These surgical interventions, including resections of the colon, and the removal of the teeth, tonsils, and occasionally stomach, were widely discredited during the 1930s when it was discovered that permanent recovery did not typically occur after such interventions, and the mortality of such colon surgeries was unacceptably high.

He died in London on 13 January 1937.

== Medical Mission to Serbia 1915 ==
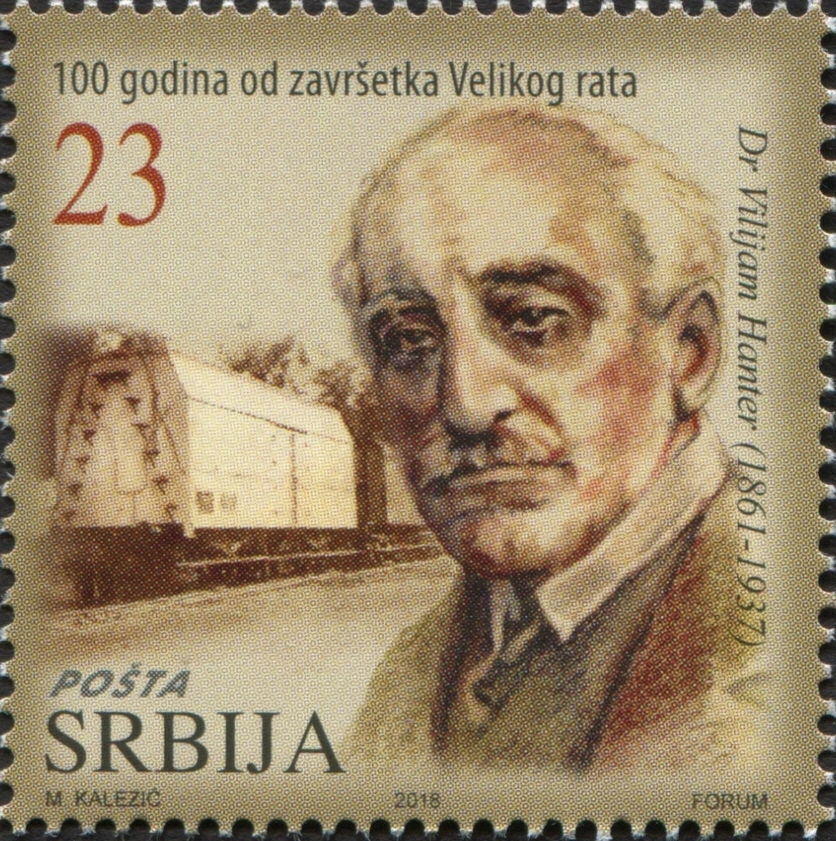
Dr William Hunter on a 2018 Serbian stamp

He headed the British Military Sanitary Committee to Serbia in 1915 tasked with stopping the 1915 typhus and relapsing fevers there. The epidemic was stopped by June 1915 by introduction of several movement restriction measures and by introduction of a widely used disinfection method, so called Serbian barrel. The mission was described by Dr Hunter himself in a paper presented to the Royal Society of Medicine. The paper was positively reviewed in the Nature Magazine. In Serbia, Hunter is credited as the main contributor to the arrest of the epidemic. For his work, he was created a Grand Officer of the Serbian Order of St. Sava and a stamp was issued in his honour by the Serbian Post.

== Family ==
In 1894 he married Beatrice Fielden, daughter of Joshua Fielden MP.

== Selected publications ==
- Hunter, William (1901). Oral Sepsis as a Cause of "septic Gastritis," "toxic Neuritis," and Other Septic Conditions: With Illustrative Cases.
