= Cedillo v. Secretary of Health and Human Services =

Legal case in US Court of Federal Claims, decided in 2009

- Court: United States Court of Federal Claims
- Decided: February 12, 2009
- Transcript: Available here

Case history
- Appealed to: United States Court of Appeals for the Federal Circuit
- Subsequent action: Upheld at Appeal

Court membership
- Judge sitting: George Hastings

Michelle Cedillo v. Secretary of Health and Human Services, also known as Cedillo, was a court case involving the family of Michelle Cedillo, an autistic girl whose parents sued the United States government because they believed that her autism was caused by her receipt of both the measles-mumps-and-rubella vaccine (also known as the MMR vaccine) and thimerosal-containing vaccines. The case was a part of the Omnibus Autism Proceeding, where petitioners were required to present three test cases for each proposed mechanism by which vaccines had, according to them, caused their children's autism; Cedillo was the first such case for the MMR-and-thimerosal hypothesis.

The family sought compensation from the National Vaccine Injury Compensation Program (NVICP), but in order to qualify they were required to prove that it was more likely than not that their children's autism was caused by their vaccines. The scientific community had concluded that vaccines did not cause autism years before the first cases were heard, and concern was therefore expressed that the relatively lax evidentiary standards of the NVICP could lead to compensation being awarded in spite of the compelling scientific evidence to the contrary. This, some vaccine supporters argued, might have serious adverse public health effects by discouraging vaccine manufacturers from producing more childhood vaccines. Though the NVICP had existed since 1988, it was not designed to handle the thousands of cases it received from 1999 to 2007, which led to the establishment of the Omnibus Autism Proceeding in 2002.

The trial opened on June 11, 2007, in Washington, D.C. The Cedillos' six expert witnesses argued that thimerosal-containing vaccines degraded Michelle's immune system, which in turn made it possible for the weakened measles virus in the MMR vaccine to cause a persistent infection leading to autism. In support of this hypothesis, the Cedillos' witnesses relied on the reported detection of measles virus in Michelle's gastrointestinal tract by John O'Leary's Unigenetics laboratory in Dublin. However, the government's expert witnesses conclusively demonstrated that O'Leary's positive results were caused by contamination in the Unigenetics lab rather than an actual infection.

On February 12, 2009, the special masters ruled that the Cedillos were not entitled to compensation as they had failed to demonstrate that thimerosal-containing vaccines in combination with the MMR vaccine could cause autism. The special masters concluded, among other things, that the government's experts were considerably more qualified than those testifying on behalf of the families, with special master George Hastings stating that "the Cedillos have been misled by physicians who are guilty, in my view, of gross medical misjudgment."

== Background ==
The National Vaccine Injury Compensation Program was established in 1988 in the United States by the passing of the National Childhood Vaccine Injury Act, and is funded by a 75-cent tax on each vaccine dose. The program's aims were to maintain a steady supply of vaccines while, at the same time, allowing victims of vaccine injury to be compensated more efficiently than was previously possible. The program operates according to a no-fault principle. The family of Michelle Cedillo sought compensation from this program. Cedillo, a then 12-year-old female wheelchair user from Yuma, Arizona, was involved in the first of three test cases chosen by the government to represent the approximately 4,900 other vaccine-autism cases that had been brought before the court. Michelle Cedillo was born on August 30, 1994, and received thimerosal-containing vaccines during the first fifteen months of her life. On December 20, 1995, she received an MMR vaccine. Theresa and Michael Cedillo filed a vaccine injury claim on behalf of their daughter on December 9, 1998, for encephalopathy, but on January 14, 2002, changed their petition to a causation-in-fact claim, meaning they were arguing that Michelle developed autism as a result of the combined effects of thimerosal and the MMR vaccine. They did this as a result of a meeting that had taken place the previous year, between Theresa Cedillo and Andrew Wakefield, at a Defeat Autism Now! conference.

In 2001, many other families also filed suit in the NVICP, also because they believed their children's autism had been caused by vaccines and they were therefore entitled to compensation. The following year, the Office of Special Masters of the United States Court of Federal Claims held a series of meetings to decide how to deal with these claims, and that July, issued an order establishing the Omnibus Autism Proceeding. According to the Cedillos, Michelle was developmentally normal until she received her MMR vaccine at the age of 15 months, at which point she developed a 105-degree fever, began vomiting and developed diarrhea. Michelle was diagnosed with autism 18 months after receiving her MMR vaccine. According to The Washington Post, the legal standard to which the cases were subjected in this trial meant that "the outcome will hinge not on scientific standards of evidence but on a legal standard of plausibility—what one lawyer for the families called '50 percent and a feather'." It was in 2002 that, given the large number of litigants seeking compensation from the NVICP, the Omnibus Autism Proceeding was established. Its aim was to resolve pending vaccine-autism claims "aggressively but fairly."

== Overview ==
Prior to the Cedillo case beginning, the scientific community had conducted considerable research into the hypothesized link between either the MMR vaccine and autism or thimerosal-containing vaccines and autism. This research had consistently come to the conclusion that no such link existed. However, some vaccine supporters, such as Paul Offit, argued that the standards for proving a vaccine had "caused" an adverse effect in the NVICP were far too low, and that the court might therefore find in favor of the Cedillos anyway. They also argued that if this happened, the vaccine manufacturers might be discouraged from manufacturing childhood vaccines, which might lead to more frequent vaccine shortages.

In the Cedillo case, her family claimed that Michelle was normal until receiving her vaccines, as evidenced by a number of videos of her between the age of 6 and 8 months. They also argued that thimerosal-containing vaccines degraded her immune system, which made it possible for the measles virus to infect her and cause autism and the other health problems she has, which include inflammatory bowel disease, glaucoma and epilepsy. The evidence presented for this consisted primarily of the detection of measles virus in Michelle Cedillo's GI tract. According to the testimony of Marcel Kinsbourne, a pediatric neurologist and professor of psychology at the New School, the vaccine strain of measles virus caused autism by "... infect[ing] the gut and enter[ing] the brain, causing dysfunction of astrocytes and other brain cells, which in turn provokes high levels of the neurotransmitter glutamate, causing a state of overstimulation which manifests itself in the symptoms of autism."

=== Plaintiff's case ===
The witnesses testifying on behalf of the state whose testimony attracted the most attention were Éric Fombonne, a psychiatrist at McGill University, Jeffrey Brent, a medical toxicologist at the University of Colorado Health Sciences Center, and Stephen Bustin of Queen Mary University of London. Other experts who testified on behalf of the state included Edwin Cook, a psychiatrist, Diane Griffin, a virologist at Johns Hopkins University, Stephen Hanauer, a gastroenterologist, Christine McCusker, a pediatric immunologist, Brian Ward, a virologist who, along with Fombonne, published some research which failed to replicate the Unigenetics lab's results, and Max Wiznitzer, a pediatric neurologist.

Those who testified on behalf of the plaintiffs were H. Vasken Aposhian, a toxicologist at the University of Arizona, Arthur Krigsman, a gastroenterologist at the Johnson Center for Child Health and Development, Karin Hepner, a molecular biologist at Wake Forest University, Vera Byers, a retired immunologist, Ronald C. Kennedy, a virus immunologist at Texas Tech University and Marcel Kinsbourne, a retired pediatric neurologist.

On June 11, 2007, the plaintiffs presented their first argument, in which they contended that Michelle Cedillo, as well as other children with autism, had a "mercury efflux disorder" which was described by Aposhian, their first expert witness, as "a problem with getting a metal, in this case mercury, out of a cell." As evidence that such disorders have been documented before, he pointed to Wilson's disease. Aposhian based this claim, in part, on three peer-reviewed papers. The first such study was co-authored by Boyd Haley, and concluded that hair of children with autism contained less mercury than that of children without autism. Aposhian stated that "we know that the hair is an excretory organ and that the hair is reflective of the mercury or the metal in the blood, and the blood is a reflection of the mercury in the tissues, and so the fact that the children with autism had less mercury in their hair was a hint or indication that perhaps there was mercury efflux disorder." The second of these studies was conducted by James B. Adams, and found that baby teeth of children with autism had more than twice as much mercury as those of children without autism. Aposhian cited this study as evidence that "autistic children have a greater body burden of mercury." Another study which Aposhian used to back up this statement was one conducted by Jeff Bradstreet and Mark Geier, which gave dimercaptosuccinic acid, a chelating agent, to children and concluded that children with autism excreted much more mercury thereafter than children without autism. Aposhian also cited a number of in vitro studies as evidence that thimerosal could cause immune system dysregulation.

The following day, the plaintiffs presented their second argument, namely that the measles vaccine had caused intestinal damage. Their witness that day was gastroenterologist Arthur Krigsman, who testified that his opinion in the case depended on whether measles virus had really been detected in the intestinal tissue of Michelle Cedillo and other children with autism by the Unigenetics lab, using a study conducted by him, Dr. Hepner, Steve Walker, and Jeff Segal as evidence that the Unigenetics lab's results were reliable. This study, however, was still in its preliminary stages at the time of the trial, and had only been presented as a poster at the International Meeting for Autism Research the year before, and Walker himself warned that "We haven't done anything to demonstrate that the measles virus is causing autism or even causing bowel disease."

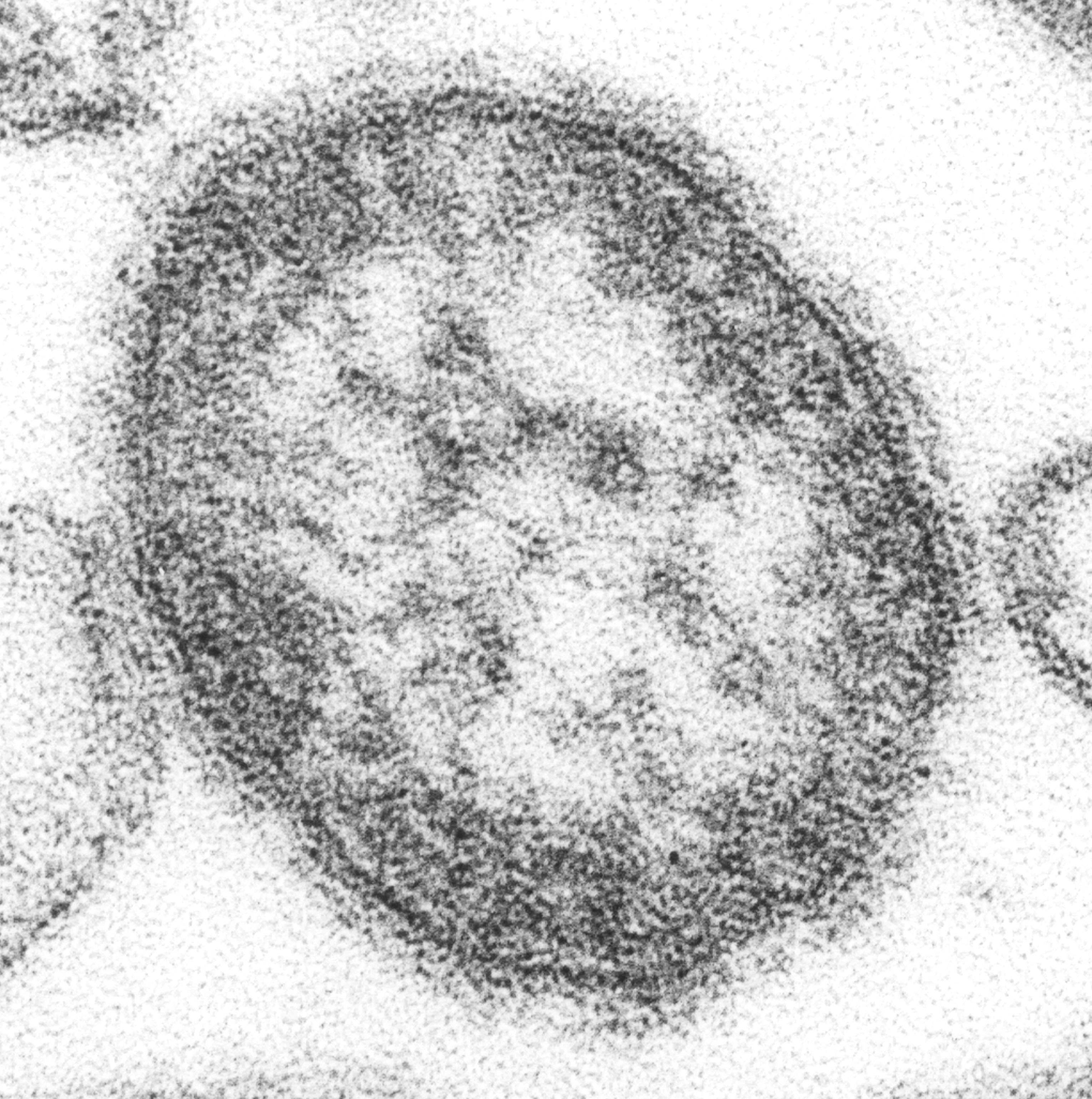
The plaintiffs also relied on lab testing which had reported that the measles virus, shown, had been detected in Michelle Cedillo's gastrointestinal tract. This argument was refuted by many of the government's witnesses.

On the trial's third day, the plaintiffs presented their next argument, which was that the Uhlmann paper, which had reported the presence of vaccine-strain measles virus in the GI tract of children with autism, used reliable PCR techniques to detect said virus. Their witness for that day was molecular biologist Karin Hepner, who testified that "... the positive and negative controls used by the Uhlmann authors [led by Dr. John J. O'Leary, who runs the Unigenetics lab in Dublin] were appropriate, that the operating procedure employed in the testing was appropriate to minimize the possibility of "contamination", and that the "assays" utilized were appropriately selected and implemented." She also contended that the two studies that had failed to replicate the Uhlmann paper's results were flawed for two reasons: because they looked at cells of children with autism rather than in their GI tract, and because they did not test children with autism with gastrointestinal dysfunction.

Immunologist Vera Byers testified that Michelle Cedillo had a dysregulated immune system, which allowed the measles virus to persist in her system, and that her malfunctioning immune system was in part a result of the virus itself. She also stated that this dysregulation was caused by "a combination of genetics and the measles virus vaccination and the thimerosal-containing vaccines that she had received."

Viral immunologist Ronald C. Kennedy testified that Michelle Cedillo had a "selective immune dysfunction". He also, like Dr. Hepner, testified that the Unigenetics lab was reliable and followed appropriate measures to prevent contamination, stating "that the laboratory of Dr. John O'Leary, Dr. Orla Sheils, and their colleagues has a good reputation." Kennedy also testified that he attended a meeting during which Dr. Cotter orally reported that his testing reached results similar to those reported by Uhlmann. However, he also acknowledged that this lab never published sequencing data, which is in line with the fact that the Uhlmann paper does not mention the sequencing process.

Retired pediatric neurologist Marcel Kinsbourne testified that Michelle was developing normally until December 20, 1995, when she was vaccinated with the MMR vaccine, and that the fever and rash she experienced shortly thereafter was caused by this vaccine. He also testified that Michelle had regressive autism, and that "since Michelle has experienced both chronic gastrointestinal problems and the chronic neurologic disorder known as autism, the most reasonable conclusion is that a single causative agent—i.e., the vaccine-strain measles virus—is the cause of both chronic conditions."

=== Opposing arguments ===
One of the key lines of evidence presented by the Cedillo family was that Michelle was developmentally normal before she received the MMR vaccine. This, they claimed, was evident from videos taken of her when she was 6 to 8 months old. However, Eric Fombonne testified that Michelle "... displayed early signs of autism clearly visibly on family video taken prior to her receiving the MMR vaccine."

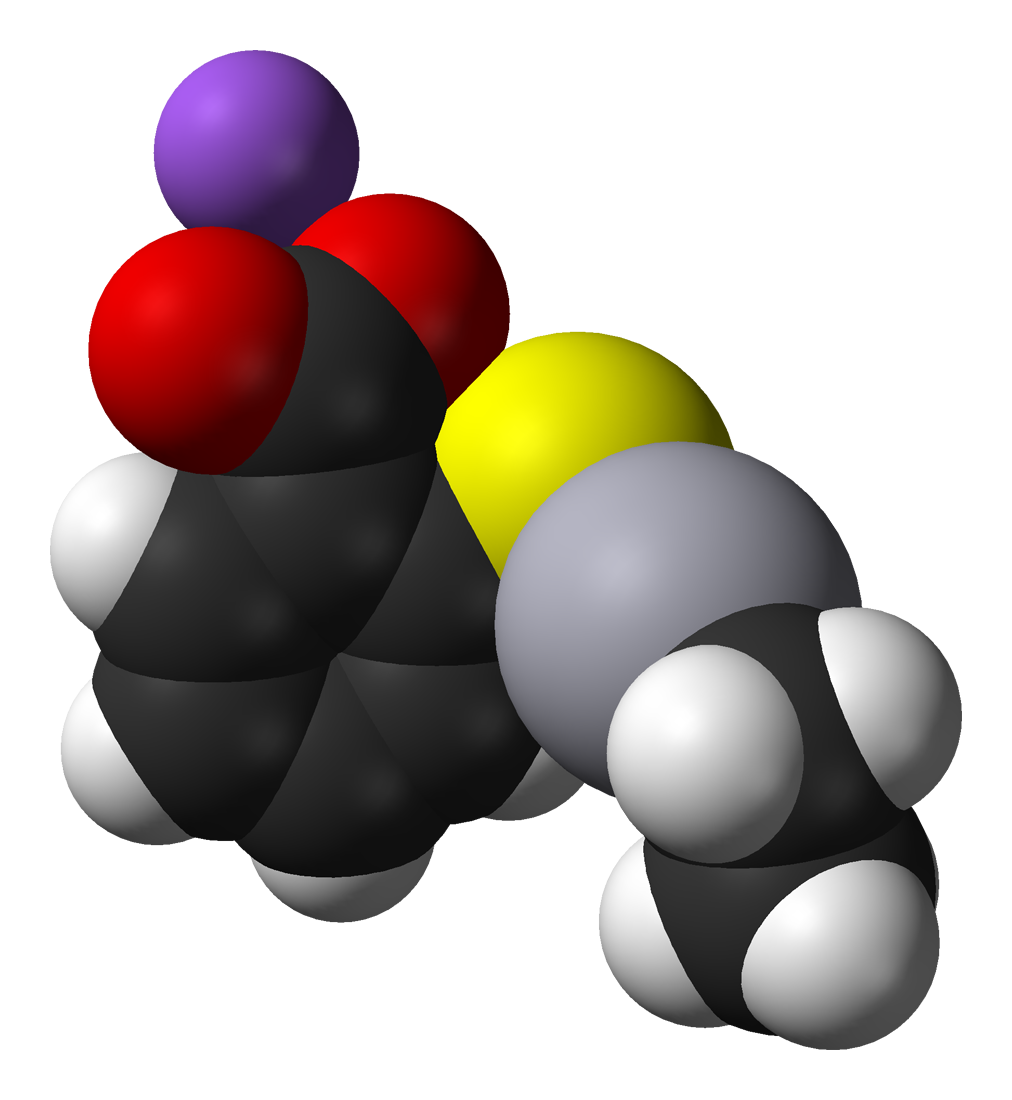
Thimerosal, a preservative formerly used in vaccines. The plaintiffs claimed that vaccines containing this preservative could cause immune system dysregulation based on a number of in vitro studies, an argument which was refuted by some of the government's witnesses.

Jeffrey Brent, the past president of the American Academy of Clinical Toxicology, was invited to testify about the potential role of thimerosal-containing vaccines in triggering Michelle's autism. He stated that "there was not a single study indicating that any form of mercury could cause serious neurological symptoms in the dosages that were used in vaccines" and criticized Aposhian's use of in vitro studies and his equating them to what happens in the actual animal, arguing that "the exposure to a cell in a petri dish was far more likely to cause damage than an equivalent dosage in a living system." With regard to specific in vitro studies, Brent argued that the Goth study was flawed because it tested thimerosal on mouse cells, not human cells; because these cells were exposed not to ethylmercury, as the human body would be after receiving a thimerosal-containing vaccine since thimerosal is quickly metabolized to ethylmercury, but to thimerosal itself, and because the cells were exposed to far higher concentrations of thimerosal than could ever occur as a result of the administration of thimerosal-containing vaccines. Brent highlighted similar problems with the Agrawal study, noting that the cells in that study, like those in the Goth study, were exposed to thimerosal, not ethylmercury, and to much higher doses than found in vaccines. He also examined the Bradstreet and Geier study and the Holmes study, noting that "much better studies from other investigators could not replicate the results of either the Holmes study or the Bradstreet/Geier study", citing two other peer-reviewed papers which had concluded that hair mercury levels were not significantly different between study participants with autism and controls, as well as a study which had concluded that children with autism had no chelatable heavy-metal body burden whatsoever. Brent also pointed out that, like another of Bradstreet's studies, the Bradstreet-Geier study had been published in a non-indexed journal, the Journal of American Physicians and Surgeons, which he described as "very much of a fringe journal with lots of alternative agendas, and it's not even indexed by the National Library of Medicine." Brent concluded by testifying that thimerosal could not have degraded Michelle's immune system to the extent that when she was vaccinated with MMR nine months later, it caused brain damage, saying "That couldn't possibly be the case." In the second set of the proceedings, which pertained to thimerosal alone (as opposed to thimerosal working in conjunction with MMR), Brent testified, with regard to Jordan King and one other child with autism who also served as a test case in this trial, that there was "absolutely no reason to chelate them for any mercury-related reason."

Many of the plaintiff's experts also relied on the reported detection of measles virus RNA in Michelle's intestinal tissue. This claim was based on results from O'Leary's Unigenetics lab, and was examined by Stephen Bustin, a world-renowned expert on polymerase chain reaction who has authored a number of scientific papers on the subject, as well as a book entitled A-Z of Quantitative PCR. He pointed out that this is based on results from the O'Leary lab, and concluded, based on a 2002 paper by Uhlmann that described their PCR methodology, that this lab contained a lot of contaminating DNA, and that the assays were actually detecting this DNA rather than the RNA which makes up the measles virus. Bustin pointed out that, among other things, O'Leary's Unigenetics lab which published this study neglected to use controls, and also did not discuss contamination. For this reason, Bustin concluded that it was a "scientific certainty" that none of the children's samples analyzed by the Unigenetics lab actually contained the measles virus. In addition, Bustin and Bertus Rima both testified that Cotter was unable to replicate the Unigenetics lab's results, in contrast to Kennedy's claim that they were able to replicate these results.

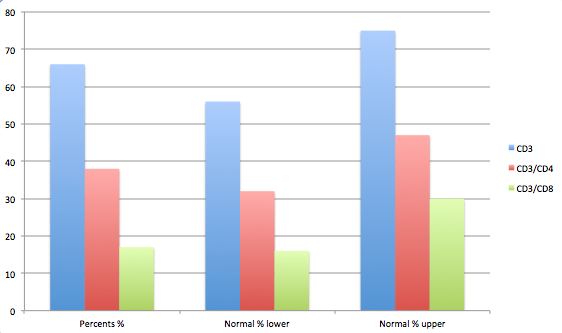
A bar graph of Michelle's T cell enumerations, left, the lower limits of the normal range of those parameters, center, and the upper limit, right. While Byers had argued that Michelle's immune system was dysregulated, Christine McCusker demonstrated that when compared to values determined by other researchers for children of Michelle's age, her parameters were within the normal ranges.

Byers' testimony was countered by that of Christine McCusker, who testified that "Dr. Byers had compared the results from several of the tests on Michelle to a set of "normal" values for such tests. The normal values utilized by Dr. Byers, however, were for adults, not children" and that "when she herself instead compared Michelle's results to an age-adjusted set of normal values, Michelle's results fell within the normal ranges", with McCusker noting in her expert report that the only marker of Th2 cell activity that was assessed in Michelle's case, namely serum Immunoglobulin E level, was entirely normal. Additionally, Ward's expert report stated that Byers' expert report contained "many statements that appear to be entirely unsubstantiated."

Kinsbourne's testimony was countered by that of Ward, who noted that if Kinsbourne were correct and persisting measles virus were causing autism, then it ought to be detectable in the blood, since Kinsbourne himself had stated that MV would travel throughout the body via the bloodstream; he also criticized Kinsbourne's expert report for citing Bradstreet et al.'s case series which had been published in the Journal of American Physicians and Surgeons. With regard to this study, Ward said that "the cerebrospinal antibody data from the three ASD children included in this manuscript actually argue powerfully AGAINST a persistent measles infection in the brains of these children." Ward also noted that Krigsman had cited research conducted by Vijendra K. Singh of Utah State University which had concluded that more than 80% of children with autism had elevated measles antibodies. However, Ward stated in his expert report that "Unless virtually all cases of autism are caused by measles virus (a position expressly excluded by the MRC, IOM and Cochrane reports), then Singh's work must be in error or there must be an alternate explanation for this finding. We have recently tested anti-measles antibodies in children with ASD and found no differences with control children." Another point of contention was a paper by Paul Ashwood, which had been cited by Kinsbourne in his expert report; however, as Ward noted, Kinsbourne had neglected to mention that Ashwood's paper concluded that "the overwhelming majority of epidemiological, population studies indicate there is no established correlation between vaccinations and autism." Additionally, Ward noted that this paper made no mention of the potential link between MMR and autism.

=== Decision ===
On February 12, 2009, the three special masters each ruled against the petitioners' causation claims. In his decision, George Hastings noted that, unlike Aposhian, Jeffrey Brent, who testified that there was no evidence that children with autism were uniquely susceptible to mercury exposure, was a medical doctor. Hastings also described Dr. Brent's testimony as "persuasive." In addition, with regard to the theory that some children are genetically hypersusceptible to mercury toxicity, Hastings concluded that the "petitioners have failed to demonstrate that this theory has any validity." According to Hastings' decision, Byers' testimony "was far outweighed by the testimony of Dr. Brent and respondent's other witnesses ..."; he also concluded that "her insistence that it was acceptable to use adult norms to measure the immune function of infants and young children was, frankly, incredible." Hastings also wrote that Kennedy made the same mistake that Byers made—namely, comparing the measurements of Michelle's immune system to the parameters for adults, and that while Kennedy testified that Cotter's results were evidence of the Unigenetics lab's testing, that "no conclusions can reasonably be drawn" regarding these results, noting that they had not yet been published. After examining Kinsbourne's testimony, Hastings concluded that it contained "... contradictions and inconsistencies ... concerning the appropriate time period between MMR vaccination and onset of autism symptoms", and also noted that Kinsbourne had not included measles virus as a cause of autism in a chart he wrote for a textbook, but had done so in the proceedings.

Hastings, in his decision, noted that "all of the petitioners' causation theories depend upon the validity of certain testing that purported to find evidence of persisting measles virus in the biological materials of Michelle and a number of other children with autism." However, Hastings concluded that this testing was "not reliable." In his decision, he noted that the authors of the D'Souza paper first performed PCR on PBMCs from children with autism, which resulted in a large proportion of apparently positive results. However, "the D'Souza group ... subjected those apparently positive samples to additional testing techniques in order to determine whether the PCR testing using the Uhlmann primers was truly identifying measles virus and only measles virus. ... The application of those two techniques revealed that all but nine of the samples that had initially tested positive by the PCR test using the Uhlmann primers were, in fact, not measles virus." With regard to the 9 remaining samples, the D'Souza paper performed sequencing on 7 of those samples. This step "demonstrated that the material, which in the PCR testing had appeared to be measles virus material, was in fact not measles virus material, but human genetic material."

With regard to the Michelle Cedillo case in general, Hastings concluded that "The evidence was overwhelmingly contrary to the petitioners' contentions." He also said that the Cedillo family had been "misled by physicians who are guilty, in my view, of gross medical misjudgment." The Cedillos appealed this case in March 2009, but the court upheld its dismissal thereof in August 2010.

== Impact ==
Promoters of the false claim that vaccines cause autism disparaged the court rulings. In response to the second rulings in 2010, SafeMinds stated, "The denial of reasonable compensation to families was based on inadequate vaccine safety science and poorly designed and highly controversial epidemiology." Similarly, Rebecca Estepp of the Coalition for Vaccine Safety said in a statement, "The deck is stacked against families in vaccine court. Government attorneys defend a government program, using government-funded science, before government judges", and Generation Rescue's J.B. Handley argued that "the courts won't concede something that will bring down the vaccination program."

On the other hand, vaccine scientists praised the ruling, with Paul Offit stating "the autism theory had 'already had its day in science court and failed to hold up.'" Additionally, Autism Speaks said that "the proven benefits of vaccinating a child to protect them against serious diseases far outweigh the hypothesized risk that vaccinations might cause autism. Thus, we strongly encourage parents to vaccinate their children to protect them from serious childhood diseases." The Department of Health and Human Services released a statement saying that "Hopefully, the determination by the special masters will help reassure parents that vaccines do not cause autism." Similarly, the chairman of the American Medical Association stated that the "recent rulings by the Special Masters of the U.S. Court of Federal Claims provide even more overwhelming evidence that there is no association between vaccines and autism or related disorders."

After the ruling, Keelan and Wilson wrote that, in contrast to those who argued that the proceedings gave unnecessary publicity to the scientifically unsupported vaccine-autism hypothesis, "the NVICP was successful in its management of these proceedings and met the intent of the original legislation to protect the integrity of the vaccine supply, maintain public confidence in immunization, and provide those injured with a fair hearing."

== See also ==
- MMR vaccine and autism
- Thiomersal and vaccines
- Vaccine court
