= Vera Byers =

American immunologist

- Education: University of California Los Angeles
- Scientific career
- Fields: Immunology
- Workplaces: University of California San Francisco
- Thesis: The specific regulatory effect of antigen on induction and paralysis of the immune response studied in vitro (1969)

Vera Steinberger Byers is an American immunologist who currently practices as a consultant in Incline Village, Nevada and was formerly a professor at the University of California San Francisco, before changing affiliations to University of Nottingham, where she helped conduct research on tumor immunology, later moving on to immunodermatology. While at UCSF, she helped develop a monoclonal antibody for use as an anticancer treatment, specifically against osteogenic sarcoma, though it was originally used against graft-versus-host disease.

While at the University of Nottingham, she published some papers on the regulation of the immune response to urushiol in poison ivy/poison oak, also using a monoclonal antibody. Her work as a medical toxicologist pertaining to trichloroethylene features in the book A Civil Action.

According to her testimony in Cedillo v. Secretary of Health and Human Services, she spent three years working at Immunex, where she worked on the anti-arthritis drug Enbrel. However, the special master in these proceedings wrote, "...there was no record at the FDA of Dr. Byers playing in any role in the Enbrel licensing application," to which Byers responded that "the information did not make a difference." The special master also wrote, "[Byers'] insistence that it was acceptable to use adult norms to measure the immune function of infants and young children was, frankly, incredible." Her testimony in this trial pertained to the alleged mechanism by which the measles virus from the MMR vaccine, in combination with thimerosal, caused autistic girl Michelle Cedillo to experience a "dysregulated immune system." It is scientific consensus that there is no link between any vaccine or vaccine ingredient and autism and that the thiomersal used as a preservative in some vaccines is not harmful.

Byers formerly served on the editorial board of the journal Cancer Immunology, Immunotherapy, and has published some research in this journal.
