= Ronald C. Kennedy =

Virus immunologist

- Born: December 3, 1954; Farmington, Connecticut
- Died: June 29, 2011 (aged 56); Lubbock
- Education: Rutgers College
- Scientific career
- Fields: Virology
- Workplaces: Texas Tech University
- Thesis: Chicken idiotypic specificities : characterization and expression (1981)

Ronald C. Kennedy (December 3, 1954 – June 29, 2011) was a virus immunologist at Texas Tech University. Prior to his appointment there he was affiliated with Baylor University, where he had previously done postdoctoral studies. Furthermore, when he switched affiliations to Texas Tech, he was also an adjunct, associate and full professor in the Departments of Microbiology and Pediatrics at the University of Texas Health Science Center at San Antonio. After his tenure in San Antonio, he switched affiliations to the University of Oklahoma Health Sciences Center's department of microbiology and immunology. In the 1980s he was affiliated with the Southwest Foundation for Biomedical Research, during which time he published some research pertaining to SV40 and intracellular protein transport. More recently, Kennedy has published some research regarding DNA vaccination, mostly in the journal Cancer Immunology, Immunotherapy.

== Education ==
Kennedy received his MS and PhD from the University of Hawaii in Honolulu after attending graduate school there, and his Bachelor of Arts degree from Rutgers College.

== Research ==
=== HIV/AIDS vaccine ===
Kennedy was active in the search for an HIV vaccine for almost as long as the disease has existed. Kennedy has stated, "I first heard about this rare form of cancer that caused an immunodeficiency in 1982 while I was working at Baylor College of Medicine." At the time, it was not yet known that HIV was the cause of this immunodeficiency. Kennedy tells a story that he was encouraged by his mentor to hop on a plane to Washington, D.C. in 1983, whereupon he took a cab to Bethesda, Maryland and entered Robert Gallo's lab.

=== Other research ===
Some of Kennedy's other research focused on the immune response to viral hepatitis. Kennedy has also helped to develop hepatitis B vaccines for chimpanzees and proposed their use in humans in a 1986 study. His lab also conducted research into immunologic mechanisms of tumor immunity associated with SV40.

== Autism omnibus trial ==
Dr. Kennedy testified on behalf of the plaintiffs in the autism omnibus trial. His testimony centered on the two different components of the immune system: the innate immune system and the adaptive immune system. Kennedy also testified about how the measles virus affects certain components of the immune system, namely dendritic cells and T lymphocytes.
