= Functional cerebral distance =

Functional Cerebral Distance is a neuropsychological principle developed by Marcel Kinsbourne. It states that, "...separate control centers that are functionally close together (i.e., highly connected in functional cerebral space) will conflict if they are independently engaged in unrelated activity." In other words, when a person attempts to perform multiple tasks associated with functionally close brain structures, interference occurs and performance is affected.

The concept of functional cerebral distance is the basis for some research into hostility. According to the Direction Model, anger activates the left prefrontal cortex. Counting also activates similar functional cerebral space, creating competition between the two activities according to Kinsbourne. This is the basis behind "counting to 10" when one is feeling angry or frustrated.

Kinsbourne's work is also the basis for Capacity Theory, which postulates that diminished right frontal lobe capacity is the cause for overly hostile individuals. This is based on the knowledge that the right frontal lobe is responsible for regulating negative emotion. The capacity model suggests that it is harder for hostile individuals to maintain stable levels of cerebral activation after experiencing physiological and cognitive right frontal stressors.
