= Dyschiria =

Neurological disorder

Dyschiria, also known as dyschiric syndrome, is a neurological disorder where one-half of an individual's body or space cannot be recognized or cannot respond to sensations. The term dyschiria is rarely used in modern scientific research and literature. Dyschiria has been often referred to as unilateral neglect, visuo-spatial neglect, or hemispatial neglect from the 20th century onwards. Psychologists formerly characterized dyschiric patients to be unable to discriminate or report external stimuli. This left the patients incapable of orienting sensory responses in their extrapersonal and personal space. Patients with dyschiria are unable to distinguish one side of their body in general, or specific segments of the body. There are three stages to dyschiria: achiria, allochiria, and synchiria, in which manifestations of dyschiria evolve in varying degrees.

The dyschiric syndrome was defined in the early 20th century by Ernest Jones, a Welsh psychiatrist, and has encapsulated several explanations of theoretical mechanisms for each stage. Over the course of time, the decreased significance of dyschiria's biopsychological influence led to its replacement by 'neglect' under neurological disorders in neuropsychology.

Dyschiric patients have deficiencies in motor, sensory, visual, and introspective zones of consciousness. These symptoms are associated with brain lesions, hysteria, and somatoparaphrenia which all affect cognition. In clinical studies, dyschiria is also referred to as the mislocalization of sensations (visual, auditory, and tactile) to the opposite half of the body which can be both unilateral and bilateral.

Treatment is limited and unestablished clinically to be proven effective for dyschiric patients, while rehabilitation methods cannot sustain stable effects. Therapeutic options majorly consist of virtual reality (VR), neglected field eye patching, and prismatic adaptation (PA) alongside other rehabilitation therapies.

== History ==
The findings of dyschiria complexly align with cases studying syndromes of spatial neglect and related disorders that have been published in medical literature in the early 20th century. Dr. Ernest Jones proposed the three stages of dyschiria as a mental syndrome in 1909. Jones studied the initial case of achiria alongside the phenomena of allochiria perceived by French psychologist Pierre Janet (1899) and Austrian neurologist Heinrich Obersteiner (1882), respectively. These independent cases defined the dyschiric syndrome and redefined allochiria.

From the 20th century onwards, "dyschiria" had been replaced by "unilateral neglect," "hemispatial neglect," and other related neurological disorders. "Unilateral neglect" replaced "dyschiria" following Austrian neurologist Marcel Kinsbourne's publication on the model mechanisms of unilateral spatial neglect. The study had a greater theoretical influence than previous experiments on dyschiria.

Neglect disorders have become one of the major concerns in the study of neuropsychology. Neglect is the umbrella term for classification of neurological disorders of distinct subtypes including the visual, somatosensory, motor, extrapersonal, personal, and representational subdivisions. Therefore, diverse neurological mechanisms have since then been proposed to investigate and explain higher cognitive functioning in the clinical study of neglect disorders. Symptom severity, pathophysiology, modality and chronology of neglect disorders also enhance the understanding of the neural networks in the brain of patients.

== Types ==
There are three forms of dyschiria in the corresponding stages: achiria, allochiria, and synchiria, that manifest the neurological disorder in distinct capacities of sensory, motor and introspective recognition. Each stage of dyschiria has been theorized to consist of various biological and psychological mechanisms.

=== Achiria ===
Unknown awareness and knowledge of the side of the stimulus is the earliest sign of achiria. Effective location of the point, nature, and intensity of stimulation is possible by the patient; with the exclusion of the side where the stimulus is applied.

Sensations that are tactile cannot be carried out by patients with motor deficits, unless the limb is specified without "left" or "right" descriptions. Involuntary and habitual movements of the same limb, such as reflex mechanisms, can be performed as regular. Despite this, the functioning of this limb becomes more imprecise when a more conscious and directed effort is required. Patients experiencing achiria have lost the memory of feeling the affected body part, regardless of having the ability to recognize its existence. This experience is closely associated with the attitude of "depersonalization" felt by patients who have severe forms of hysterical anesthesia.

==== Theoretical Mechanism: Paradoxical Cleavage ====
Senses can be categorized into two types: memory-focused and aesthesic. Memory-focused senses are those obtained through previous experiences (e.g. knowing the difference between left and right). Aesthesic senses are obtained through ongoing experiences (e.g. smell and touch). Both senses can be damaged by functional disorders, however the time taken for recovery and reacquisition the senses can differ among the two groups.

In recovery from functional disorders, aesthesic senses usually recover quicker than memory-focused senses. Dr. Ernest Jones described this variation as a "paradoxical cleavage" and theorized it as the cause of achiria. Earlier recovery of tactile sensations relative to recognition between left and right sides underscores achiric symptoms.

=== Allochiria ===
Being able to recognize the precise location of the stimulus on the corresponding position on the contralateral side of the body is referred to as allochiria. The location to which the stimulus is pointed on the corresponding opposite half of the body is done with exact symmetry.

If patients are asked to carry out motor responses on the affected limb, they will instantly direct the movement of the opposite limb with full conviction. These confusions occur in bilateral allochiria. However, the affected limb can only be directed using its opposite direction (i.e. using the right hand requires the term "left" to be used) or it loses physiological function in unilateral allochiria.

Allochiric patients do not have the full ability to feel the affected limb in unilateral senses. The affected limb can only be felt on the opposite side and rarely on the correct half of the body as directed in movement. These patients may feel a "dead" limb and an "active" limb on the unaffected side of the body, while the affected half is seldom felt at all. Often, patients will feel that they only have one limb out of a pair on the unaffected side of the body.

Bilateral allochiric patients have the mental capacity to feel both limbs on both sides of the body, only when it is asymmetrically commanded.

==== Theoretical Mechanism: Central Nervous System Damage ====
Tactile allochiria is present in individuals with damage to the central nervous system. A study found 20 patients with cerebral hemorrhage unable to correctly localize tactile stimulation. When pinched on their arms, they incorrectly localized it to the corresponding area on the opposite arm. The same result was obtained when participants were exposed to other forms of tactile stimulation (e.g. exposure of the arm to cold/hot objects and vibration).

Brain lesions or other forms of brain damage (often caused by strokes) can lead to neglect of one's contralesional space. Information from the left and right egocentric spaces is principally understood by the neurons of the right parietal cortex. The right region is also weakly managed by the neurons of the left parietal cortex.

Damage to the right parietal cortex is thus more severe as it solely maintains the attention towards the left space. This makes neglect of the left space more prevalent as there is no mitigating component. The neglect caused by the lesion does not undermine the detection of tactile sensations, however hinders tactile localization. When stimulated by touch on the contralesional arm, the touch is detected, however the location of contact is transposed by the patient to the ipsilesional arm as the contralesional space cannot be acknowledged.

=== Synchiria ===
Recognition of stimulus in both corresponding sides of the body as two concurrent sensations, when only applied to one affected part, is known as synchiria. In terms of motor response, the patient carries out movement on both sides of the body simultaneously even when asked to conduct motion on the affected side. This movement is only felt by the affected side of the patient's body.

Introspectively, the patient is under the impression that they are moving their affected limb and is unable to differentiate between the two halves of their body. According to Dr. Ernest Jones, patients could feel the affected side being displaced and shifting between the two halves of the median plane of their body.

==== Theoretical Mechanism: Brain Lesions ====
The presence of synchiria is attributed to brain lesions. A study on a patient with a brain lesion on their left hemisphere showed detection of touch to be possible, lacking accurate identification of the point of contact. Specifically, he claimed to have experienced tactile sensation on both his left (ipsilesional) and right (contralesional) hands, when only his left hand was stimulated.

It is suggested that there are two pathways for somatosensory activity. The first is the contralateral pathway, where each hemisphere receives sensory information from and transmits motor information to their opposite egocentric spaces (i.e., the left side of the body to the right hemisphere). The second, the ipsilateral pathway, allows for the transmission of information along the same side of the body (i.e., the left side of the body to the left hemisphere).

In a healthy individual, when a hand is stimulated by touch, there is increased brain activity in the contralateral hemisphere, and decreased activity in the ipsilateral hemisphere. This suggests the presence of mechanisms to inhibit the hemispheres from processing ipsilateral sensations. This inhibition is necessary to discriminate between the points of contact. The absence or damage of this inhibition is theorized to result in the exhibition of synchiria. Despite there being one tactile stimulation, the sensory information is processed by both hemispheres. This hinders one's ability to localize the touch to one hand and instead results in them feeling the sensation on both hands.

== Recovery and Therapies ==
No treatment is established to be entirely effective on patients with dyschiria and related neglect disorders as the functioning mechanisms of the syndromes are varied. Therapeutic options are unable to maintain stable positive effects and are difficult to transfer for daily-life usage with certainty. Major treatments for dyschiria include virtual reality (VR), neglected field eye patching, and prismatic adaptation (PA).

=== Virtual Reality (VR) ===
Virtual reality allows for the simulation of daily life circumstances to rehabilitate control of limbs, eyes, and head movement. This virtual simulation encourages transformations of postural shifts for patients. Improvements in body coordination and sensations in daily-life activities can be practiced as patients achieve targets for movement with varying difficulties through the virtual simulation. VR increases body awareness in neglect disorders like dyschiria with results persisting over five months.

=== Neglected Field Eye Patching ===
Neglected field eye patching covers the eye on the affected side of the body through an obstructing spectacle lens or glasses. The eye patch can be placed on either hemifield of the affected eye depending on the patient's weakness in spatial neglect. The covered eye results in hemifield occlusion of vision which enables the individual to focus their awareness on the contralateral space using the deficient side of the body.

=== Prismatic Adaptation (PA) ===
Prismatic adaptation therapy involves the production of an optical displacement in patients through prismatic goggles. Patients with prismatic goggles are required to perform visual target tasks such as pointing and throwing. This therapy can lead to the correction of biased body representation, however prismatic adaptation therapy may only focus on motor-intention responses of neglect and dyschiria than space perceptions.

Other rehabilitation therapies include

- Alertness-training
- Neck muscle vibration
- Non-invasive brain stimulation (NIBS)
- Repetitive optokinetic stimulation
- Visual scanning with exploration training

Some recovery protocols are used in conjunction to create amplified positive results. Neck muscle vibration technique alongside simultaneous visual exploration training resulted in sound enhancements for patients with spatial neglect.

== Future Development ==
The phenomena of dyschiria on body representation require further investigation for the development of theories and mechanisms around neuropsychological dissociations in concepts of the body schema and body image. These various concepts coincide with the nature of neglect syndromes akin to dyschiria to better understand the functioning of the brain.
