= H. Vasken Aposhian =

American toxicologist (1926–2019)

Hurair Vasken Aposhian
- Born: January 28, 1926
- Died: September 6, 2019 (aged 93)
- Other name: Vasken Apohian
- Education: Brown University, University of Rochester, Stanford University
- Known for: Arsenic-related research
- Spouse: Mary M. Aposhian
- Children: Christine M. and David L. Aposhian
- Scientific career
- Fields: Toxicology
- Workplaces: University of Arizona

Hurair Vasken Aposhian (January 28, 1926 — September 6, 2019) was a Ph.D. toxicologist and an emeritus professor of molecular and cell biology at the University of Arizona, a post he held beginning in 1975. He is also a former professor of pharmacology at the medical school at said university. He received his bachelor's degree in chemistry, at Brown University, 1948. He received a master's degree and a PhD in physiological chemistry at the University of Rochester, where he published some scientific studies about the synthesis of isoalloxazine ring-containing compounds. He did a postdoctoral with Nobel Laureate Arthur Kornberg in the department of biochemistry at Stanford University School of Medicine. He is best known for his pioneering work on Succimer and Unithiol in the treatment of arsenic, mercury, lead and other heavy metals leading to FDA approval of succimer in childhood lead poisoning at levels over 40 ug/dl. Previous posts he had held include at Vanderbilt, Tufts University, and the University of Maryland, College Park. His views about mercury in vaccines and in dental amalgams go against the consensus of the medical community and are controversial.

== Research ==
Aposhian's first academic appointment was to Vanderbilt University School of Medicine, and he was an instructor there from 1954 to 1956. Some of his research has been published in the Journal of Virology, and in the autism omnibus trial he testified that he was "the first one to show that a virus could transfer genetic information that was not in it originally." He also testified that he acted as a biochemical geneticist from 1959 until he went to teach at Tufts University in 1967, during which time he was affiliated with Stanford University. He would leave Tufts in 1970 to become department chair at the University of Maryland School of Medicine. He has published more than 100 peer-reviewed studies on heavy metal poisoning. In 1964, Aposhian, along with, notably Arthur Kornberg, both of whom were affiliated with Stanford University at the time, published "Enzymatic Synthesis of Deoxyribonucleic Acid" in the Journal of Biological Chemistry. Kornberg would go on to win the Nobel Prize for discovering the biological mechanism by which DNA is synthesized. His more recent research has focused on the metabolism of arsenic compounds, in particular, deciphering polymorphisms in the gene that codes for glutathione S-transferase, which is involved in arsenic detoxification. Some of this research he has authored along with his wife, Mary M. Aposhian, who died in 2009. Professor Aposhian has research experience and publications dealing with the toxicology of heavy metals, in particular arsenic and mercury. This has included the enzymology of arsenic biotransformation; the study of human populations in Chile, Inner Mongolia, Romania, Mexico and rural Southwest China as to their body burden of arsenic or mercury; the human metabolism of chelating agents; and biochemical genetics in particular gene transfer in mammalian cells.

== Views on mercury exposure ==
Aposhian has advocated for the view that thimerosal-containing vaccines cause autism, and testified before the Institute of Medicine in 2004 before they issued a review concluding that the evidence favors rejecting a vaccine-autism link.

=== Cedillo v. Secretary of Health and Human Services ===
In the 2007 court case Cedillo v. Secretary of Health and Human Services, Aposhian was the first witness called to the stand by the claimant's lawyers. In his testimony, Aposhian elaborated on a potential hypothesis as to how MMR and thimerosal-containing vaccines might have worked together to cause autism. The proposed mechanism involved something known as "mercury efflux disorder", and Aposhian testified that "The hypothesis was made less than three or four weeks ago." He also stated that efflux disorders have been documented before, and described them as "problems with getting a metal, in this case mercury, out of a cell", citing Wilson's disease as an example thereof. Aposhian also testified, with regard to the concept of a dose-response relationship, that "This is an ancient form of quotation that until recently we taught in medical schools, and in undergraduate school, and in graduate school. We now have to consider the hyper susceptibility of people." According to Arthur Allen, author of the book Vaccine, "On cross examination, Aposhian acknowledged there was no record of any child becoming autistic as a result of mercury exposures prior to the thimerosal theory." In the end, the special master decided that "The reports and advice given to the Cedillos by Dr. [Arthur] Krigsman and some other physicians, advising the Cedillos that there is a causal connection between Michelle’s MMR vaccination and her chronic conditions, have been very wrong. Unfortunately, the Cedillos have been misled by physicians who are guilty, in my view, of gross medical misjudgment". The decisions in the case implied that doctors who base their treatments on them are unscientific and unethical.

== Dental amalgam controversy ==
In addition to being opposed to mercury in vaccines, Aposhian has also voiced concern about the safety of mercury in dental amalgam fillings. On July 11, 1994, Aposhian was interviewed for a BBC program entitled "Poison in the Mouth." The host of the program, Tom Mangold, said that Aposhian's research had shown that two-thirds of the mercury in the body came from dental amalgam fillings. Additionally, when a meeting, "Mercury in Medicine: Are we taking unnecessary risks?", was held on July 18, 2000, Aposhian said, "The mercury amalgams in your mouth, the so-called silver fillings, contain 48 to 50 percent of elemental mercury. These fillings continuously emit mercury vapor, which will go to the brain and is converted to mercuric mercury….Certain fish contain methylmercury; again, very rapidly taken up from the GI tract, transported quickly to the brain, and converted very slowly to mercuric mercury….thimerosal which again will be taken up by the brain and quickly converted to mercuric mercury – all three forms are neurotoxic. By neurotoxic, we mean it will damage nerve and it will damage brain tissues." These concerns are supported by Aposhian's "research", which has concluded that there exists "a positive correlation between the amount of amalgam in the teeth and the amount of amalgam in the body" of subjects who were given the widely discredited "provoked testing" chelating agent 2,3-dimercapto-1-propanesulfonic acid. This method however has been proven to provide unreliable results which do not reflect the true "body burden" of heavy metals in the patient.

== Selected publications ==
=== Mercury ===
- Echeverria, D.; Aposhian, H. V.; Woods, J. S.; Heyer, N. J.; Aposhian, M. M.; Bittner Jr, A. C.; Mahurin, R. K.; Cianciola, M. (1998). "Neurobehavioral effects from exposure to dental amalgam Hg(o): New distinctions between recent exposure and Hg body burden". FASEB Journal. 12 (11): 971–980. doi:10.1096/fasebj.12.11.971. PMID 9707169. S2CID 3977629.
- Maiorino, R. M.; Gonzalez-Ramirez, D.; Zuniga-Charles, M.; et al. (1996). "Sodium 2,3-dimercaptopropane-1-sulfonate challenge test for mercury in humans. III. Urinary mercury after exposure to mercurous chloride". The Journal of Pharmacology and Experimental Therapeutics. 277 (2): 938–944. PMID 8627576.
- Aposhian, H. V.; Morgan, D. L.; Queen, H. L.; Maiorino, R. M.; Aposhian, M. M. (2003). "Vitamin C, glutathione, or lipoic acid did not decrease brain or kidney mercury in rats exposed to mercury vapor". Journal of Toxicology. Clinical Toxicology. 41 (4): 339–347. doi:10.1081/CLT-120022000. PMID 12870874. S2CID 23474286.

=== Arsenic ===
- Goering, P. L.; Aposhian, H. V.; Mass, M. J.; Cebrián, M.; Beck, B. D.; Waalkes, M. P. (1999). "The enigma of arsenic carcinogenesis: Role of metabolism". Toxicological Sciences. 49 (1): 5–14. doi:10.1093/toxsci/49.1.5. PMID 10367337.
- Abernathy, C. O.; Liu, Y. P.; Longfellow, D.; et al. (1999). "Arsenic: Health effects, mechanisms of actions, and research issues". Environmental Health Perspectives. 107 (7): 593–597. doi:10.1289/ehp.99107593. PMC 1566656. PMID 10379007.
- Naujokas, M. F.; Anderson, B.; Ahsan, H.; Aposhian, H. V.; Graziano, J. H.; Thompson, C.; Suk, W. A. (2013). "The Broad Scope of Health Effects from Chronic Arsenic Exposure: Update on a Worldwide Public Health Problem". Environmental Health Perspectives. 121 (3): 295–302. doi:10.1289/ehp.1205875. PMC 3621177. PMID 23458756.
