= Jeffrey Brent =

Medical toxicologist

Jeffrey A. Brent
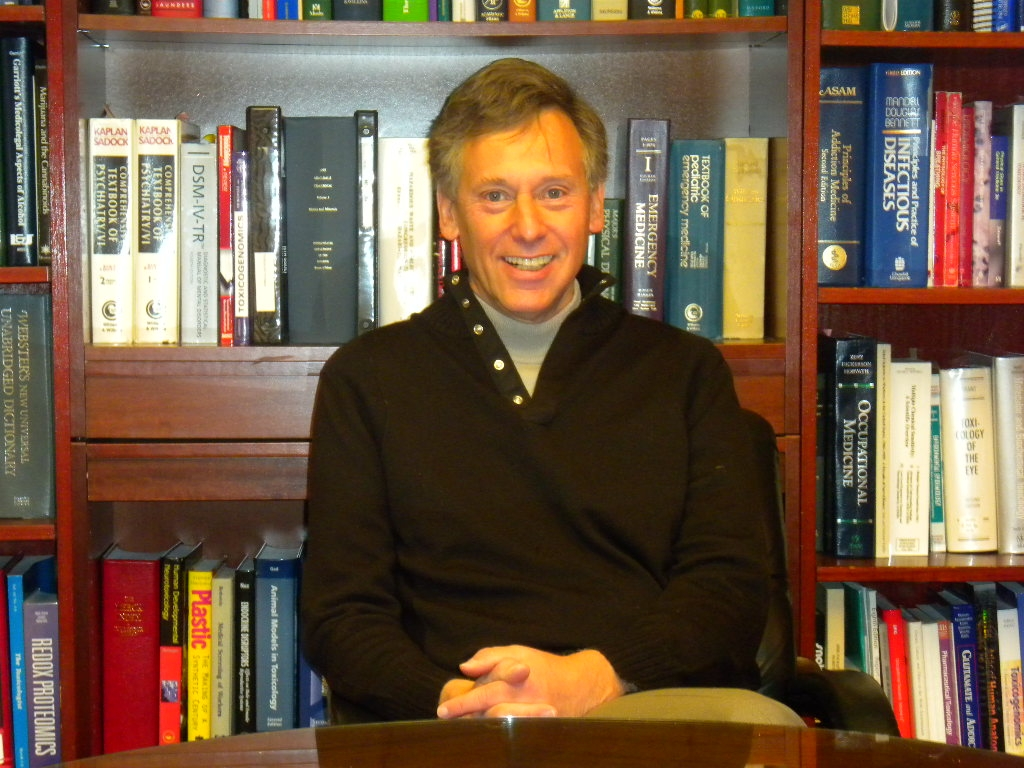
- Education: Mount Sinai School of Medicine
- Scientific career
- Fields: Medical toxicology
- Workplaces: University of Colorado Health Sciences Center
- Thesis: The toxicity of 5-bromo 2'-deoxyuridine to malignant lymphoid cells (1978)

Jeffrey A. Brent is a medical toxicologist who is a distinguished clinical professor of medicine and emergency medicine at the University of Colorado, School of Medicine. In addition, he is a professor at the Department of Environmental and Occupational Health at the Colorado School of Public Health. He is also the past president of the American Academy of Clinical Toxicology, was editor in chief of the journal Toxicological Reviews, and was a member of the board of directors of the American College of Medical Toxicology. Previously, most of Brent's research focused on the use of fomepizole as a treatment for both methanol and ethylene glycol poisoning, and he led a trial of this drug which resulted in the FDA approving it in December 1997. Currently, Brent serves as Director of the Toxicology Investigators Consortium, an NIH, CDC and FDA supported multi center research and surveillance group. Brent is also a senior editor of the textbook "Critical Care Toxicology: Diagnosis and Management of the Critically Poisoned Patient", originally published in 2005, and now in its second edition, which was published in 2017.

== Education ==
Brent graduated from Hunter College with a Bachelor of Arts in chemistry, as well as a master's degree in molecular biology. He completed his PhD in biochemistry at Mount Sinai School of Medicine and earned his MD from the State University of New York at Buffalo's School of Medicine. He also completed a fellowship in medical toxicology at Denver Health Medical Center, a residency at Emory University and an internship at Beth Israel Deaconess Medical Center.

== Career ==
He was initially appointed to the University of Colorado in 1987 as an instructor, and then was promoted to assistant professor, then associate, then full, and finally to distinguished professor. He has authored more than 300 peer-reviewed publications. He was the chair of the toxicology section of the American College of Emergency Physicians from 1991 to 1993. Brent has published many scientific studies, primarily in the area of medical toxicology.

Brent was one of the U.S. government's experts in the autism omnibus hearings, in which he testified in support of the scientific consensus that thimerosal-containing vaccines do not cause autism, and specifically criticized a study by Holmes et al. which the plaintiffs had cited to argue that thimerosal containing vaccines were dangerous to a specific subpopulation who were not as good at excreting mercury in hair. He also argued that chelation therapy is of no use as a treatment for autism, and that the signs and symptoms of autism are very different from those of ethylmercury poisoning.

== Testimony ==
In the so-called autism omnibus trial, Brent testified on behalf of the government, i.e. that thimerosal does not cause autism. In particular, he criticized the concept of hypersensitivity to thimerosal as a concept that had been invoked as a way to bypass real science. He also testified that, with regard to the levels of mercury in the urine of Jordan King and William Mead, who had been chelated, that "You always expect to see levels in the urine bump post-chelation." He also criticized the plaintiff's use of Doctor's Data Laboratories as relying on urine mercury levels rather than the gold standard, blood mercury levels. Brent has also voiced opposition to the use of chelation therapy as an autism treatment both in the omnibus trial, where he testified that "there was absolutely no reason to chelate them [the children who served as the test cases] for any mercury-related reason", and in peer-reviewed journals.

== Selected publications ==
- Wax, Paul M.; Culbreth, Rachel E.; Brent, Jeffrey; Hantsch, Christina; Mikhailov, Theresa; Brundage, Nancy; Aldy, Kim; Medical Toxicology Investigators Consortium (if applicable) (3 February 2025). "Medical Toxicology Consultations and Mortality Among Patients With Poisonings in the PICU". JAMA Network Open. 8 (2): e2462139. doi:10.1001/jamanetworkopen.2024.62139. PMC 11871539.
- Cembellin-Kao, Adenine; Aldy, Kim; Brent, Jeffrey; Culbreth, Rachel; LaBozzetta, Crystal; Turcios, Miguel Alexander; Wax, Paul; Yonamine, Chase; Stolbach, Andrew (2025). "Occult bromazolam exposure in patients presenting with opioid or stimulant overdose". Clinical Toxicology. 63 (5): 330–336. doi:10.1080/15563650.2025.2490831.
- McCabe, Daniel J.; Gibbs, Heath; Pratt, Alessandra A.; Culbreth, Rachel; Sutphin, Amanda M.; Abston, Stephanie; Li, Shao; Wax, Paul; Brent, Jeffrey; Campleman, Sharan; Aldy, Kim; Falise, Alyssa; Manini, Alex F.; ToxIC Fentalog Study Group (3 March 2025). "Risk of Delayed Intubation After Presumed Opioid Overdose in the Emergency Department". Annals of Emergency Medicine. 85 (6): 498–504. doi:10.1016/j.annemergmed.2025.01.022. PMID 40047773.
- Brent, J. (2010). "Fomepizole for the treatment of pediatric ethylene and diethylene glycol, butoxyethanol, and methanol poisonings". Clinical Toxicology. 48 (5): 401–406. doi:10.3109/15563650.2010.495347. PMID 20586570. S2CID 39890372.
- Brent, J. (2009). "Fomepizole for Ethylene Glycol and Methanol Poisoning". New England Journal of Medicine. 360 (21): 2216–2223. doi:10.1056/NEJMct0806112. PMID 19458366.
- Kerns II, W.; Tomaszewski, C.; McMartin, K.; Ford, M.; Brent, J.; META Study Group. Methylpyrazole for Toxic Alcohols (2002). "Formate kinetics in methanol poisoning". Journal of Toxicology. Clinical Toxicology. 40 (2): 137–143. doi:10.1081/CLT-120004401. PMID 12126185. S2CID 10699821.
- Brent, J.; McMartin, K.; Phillips, S.; Aaron, C.; Kulig, K.; Methylpyrazole for Toxic Alcohols Study Group (2001). "Fomepizole for the Treatment of Methanol Poisoning". New England Journal of Medicine. 344 (6): 424–429. doi:10.1056/NEJM200102083440605. PMID 11172179.
- Brent, J. A.; Rumack, B. H. (1993). "Role of free radicals in toxic hepatic injury II. Are free radicals the cause of toxin-Induced liver injury?". Clinical Toxicology. 31 (1): 173–196. doi:10.3109/15563659309000384. PMID 8433412.
