= Achiria =

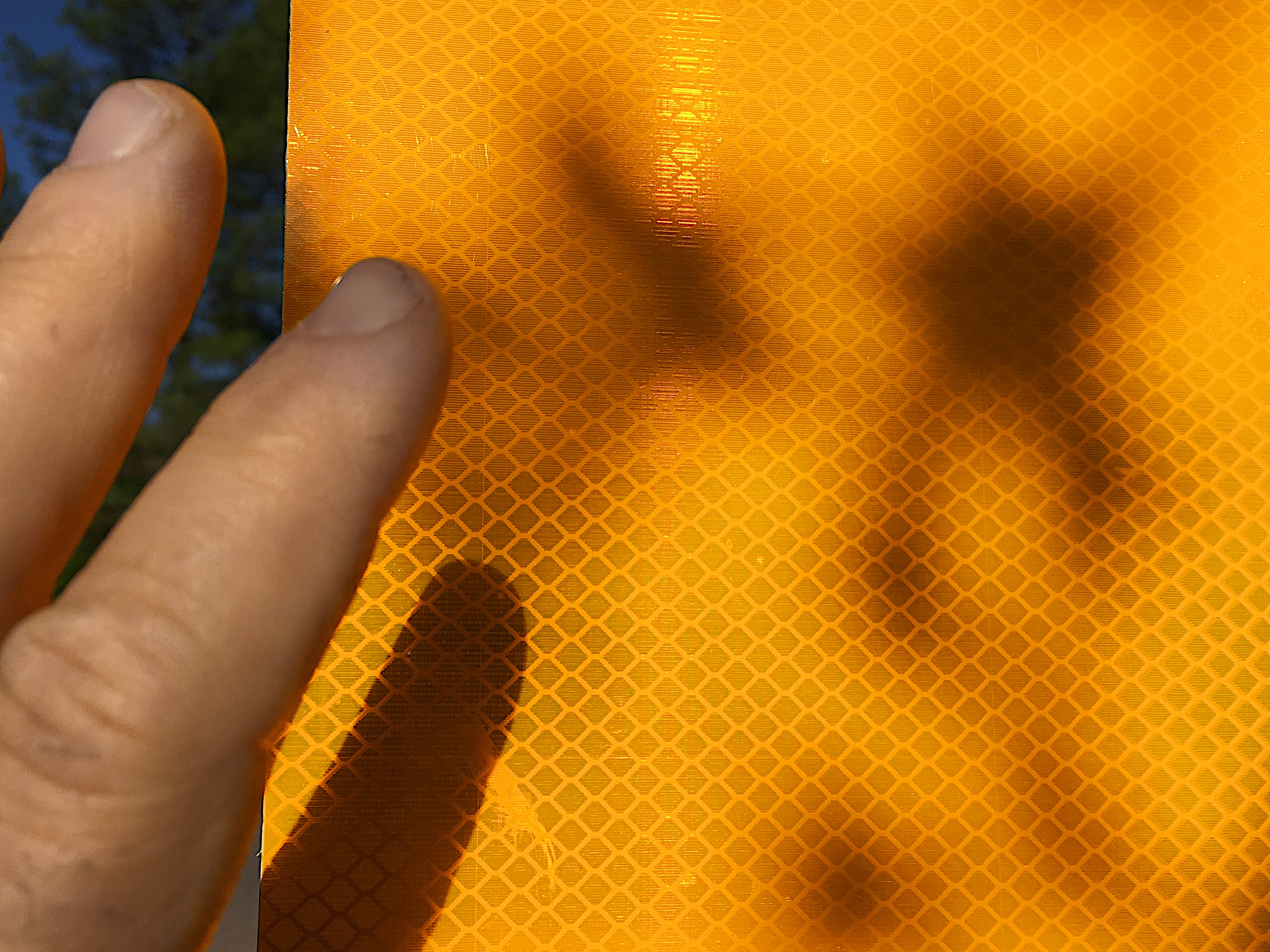
- Patients with Achiria have an impaired sense of touch
- Specialty: Neurology
- Symptoms: Inability to recognize or perceive one side of the body.
- Types: Sensory Achiria, Motor Achiria, and Introspective Achiria.

Achiria, also referred to as "Simple Allochiria", is a neurological disorder in which a patient is unable to recognise or perceive one side of their body. It is oftentimes associated with dyschiria, also known as a form of unilateral neglect or hemispatial neglect. The term achiria is seldom used in modern scientific literature.

Psychologists in the past defined dyschiria as the inability of patients to distinguish the side of which a given stimulus is generated from. There are three forms of dyschiria: achiria, allochiria and synchiria, of which achiria is considered to be the primary stage.

Patients with achiria would have deficits in sensory, motor and introspective areas of consciousness. The symptoms are associated with hysteria, spinal lesions and unilateral neglect syndrome. In Greek terminology, "chiria" or "χεiρ" means hand, while the "a-" prefix means "without" or "not". However, in actual clinical practice, achiria is also referred to the inability to localize stimuli from other parts of the body.

== Types ==
=== Sensory achiria ===
Sensory achiria describes the situation when the patient is not able to feel the sidedness of a stimulus when it is applied to a body part. According to Welsh psychiatrist Ernest Jones, patients with sensory achiria are certain that they do not know which side of the body the stimulus comes from, instead of being uncertain and struggling between picking a side.

Despite the spatial disorder, the patient's sensory acuity is not necessarily affected. He/she might be able to effectively tell the position, intensity and nature of the stimulus applied, with the exception of the side of the body of which it is applied. Allochiria is the modern term that covers this phenomenon.

=== Motor achiria ===
Motor achiria describes the situation when the patient is not able to move the limb or body part in question without assistance due to the inability to distinguish left and right limbs. Voluntary movement is possible when cues other than left or right are given to the patient, but the movement is of a disproportionate strength.

However, it is also reported that involuntary movements or habitual movements do occur in the limb in question. Similar to other disorders related to hysteria, the movement of limbs is more impaired as the movement itself is more under conscious control. The modern term with approximately the same meaning is motor neglect, where the patients rarely use their contralateral limbs.

=== Introspective achiria ===
Introspective achiria describes the situation when the patient is not able to feel or retain sensory memory of the body part in question. Even when the patient knows that that body part exists on their body, they still could not feel it.

== History ==
=== Discovery ===
The first reported case of achiria was discovered in 1899 by Pierre Janet, a pioneering French psychologist. Janet noticed that a patient had an unusual symptom, of which he was not able to localize physical touch on his body. Janet named the phenomenon "simple allochiria".

The term "achiria" was first coined by Welsh psychiatrist Ernest Jones in 1907. After reviewing the past literature on allochiria from Janet, Austrian neurologist Heinrich Obersteiner and other psychologists, Jones redefined the term allochiria into two separate terms: "True allochiria" and "False allochiria" (also known as alloesthesia). False allochiria is the mislocalization of stimuli in all directions, while true allochiria is the mislocalization of stimuli only in the horizontal direction to the exact same location of the contralateral side of the body. When being touched at the inner ankle, patients with false allochiria could feel the sensation at the outer ankle, the knee, or the opposite ankle; while patients with true allochiria could only feel it at the exact same location of the inner ankle of the opposite limb. Furthermore, Jones proposed that true allochiria would be one of the three stages of a mental syndrome called dyschiria, alongside achiria and synchiria, hence the term "achiria" is coined.

Achiria often refers to the complete absence of chirognostic sense, or the sense of "sidedness" on the body. Therefore, a patient with achiria would be able to accurately tell the position and intensity of stimuli, but was unable to identify which side of the body the stimuli originated from.

=== Theory ===
There are a number of different approaches that explain the origin and symptoms of achiria.

==== Hammond's theory ====
The first theory was proposed by William A. Hammond in 1883. This theory posits that achiria (the term was not officially coined at the time) is caused by an obstruction in the efferent path, which results in impulses being passed to the contralateral side of the body, hence reaching the cerebral hemisphere opposite to where the impulses originated from.

In 1891, Albert Paul Weiss tried to validate this theory by blocking the posterior columns of the spinal cord. Bosc also did a similar demonstration in 1892, but he blocked one side of the cerebral hemisphere instead of the spinal cord, such that the signals trying to get to that hemisphere have to pass through the corpus callosum to the opposite hemisphere instead of other pathways.

==== Jones' theory ====
The second theory was proposed by Ernest Jones in 1909. Jones argued that Hammond's theory was merely a speculation because it ignored observable facts about achiria and allochiria, such as their associations with Brown-Sequard hemisection syndrome. Brown-Sequard hemisection syndrome features a unilateral block in the spinal cord, but allochiria has been recorded in patients with this syndrome. This contradicted what Hammond's theory suggests.

Jones posits that achiria is a dissociation disorder resulting from the loss of the chirognostic sense, or the sensation of "sidedness". Chirognostic sense is a type of autosomastognostic sense, or "memory senses", which we acquire through our memories of the past; as opposed to the aesthesic senses, which are senses we acquire at any given moment and through our immediate interaction with the outside world, such as heat, touch and pain, etc.

He further elaborated that functional diseases could cause damage to both types of senses. During the recovery of the functional disease, aesthesic senses may recover faster than the autosomatognostic senses, resulting in a gap between the recovery pace of different senses. This gap is called "paradoxical cleavage". Thus, a patient could accurately detect touch and pain, but is not able to recall the sidedness of this sensation. The larger the paradoxical cleavage, the more severe the symptoms would be.

==== Achiria and allochiria ====
Jones regarded achiria as the primary stage of dyschiria, of which the patients have a complete loss of their chirognostic senses. When they slowly regain back their chirognostic senses, the symptoms of achiria would transit to those of allochiria. The theory behind this change is as follows:

When a patient transits from achiria to allochiria, there is a gain in both motor function (the patient would be able to move their limbs in both sides of the body, instead of just one) as well as a gain in chirognostic memories, albeit them being distorted and the memory of one side is recalled as those of the opposite side.

The improvement of motor function and the redemption of memory senses, which were absent or incomplete in achiria patients, enhances their general well-being and their feelings of strength, power and completeness. Therefore, allochiria should be seen as a more stable and improved status than achiria, while achiria should be seen as a transitional stage. This theory was supported by the comparative prevalence of achiria and allochiria. Out of the thirty cases that Jones had collected from past literature, allochiria was present in all cases, while achiria was only present in one.

==== Unilateral neglect ====
The previous experiments related to dyschiria were not enough to make a theoretical influence. The term dyschiria was replaced by the term unilateral neglect in 1970 when Austrian neurologist Marcel Kinsbourne published a study called "A Model for the Mechanism of Unilateral Neglect of Space". In the study, Kinsbourne briefly mentioned the lack of awareness to the contralateral side to the brain lesion. Since there had already been previous studies related to unilateral neglect, this term was used instead of dyschiria. In fact, studies about unilateral neglect had started in the late 19th century, but not until a century later that it became a major topic in neurology. However, previous studies mainly focused on other aspects of unilateral neglect, like the visual aspect. For visual neglect, patients would ignore one side of their visual field.
