= Jon Poling =

American physician (born 1970)

Jon S. Poling
- Born: 1970 (age 55–56)
- Education: Georgetown University School of Medicine
- Spouse: Terry Poling
- Children: Hannah Poling
- Scientific career
- Thesis: On the mechanism of potassium channel blockade by polyunsaturated fatty acids and cannabinoids (1997)

Jon Poling is an American physician currently practicing in Athens, Georgia where he has worked at Athens Neurological Associates since 2001. He has also worked at Athens Regional Medical Center as the medical director of their apheresis unit since 2002. His area of expertise is autoimmune neurological disorders such as multiple sclerosis and neuromuscular disorders such as neuropathy or Myasthenia Gravis. He is the father of Hannah Poling, who received an injury compensation from the VICP in 2008 because Hannah manifested encephalopathy after being vaccinated by MMR. Hannah had underlying mitochondrial disease, which exacerbated her symptoms.

== Education ==
Poling obtained his bachelor's degree from Boston University in 1991. In 1995, he was granted an NIH scholarship to attend the 1995 Woods Hole Marine Biological Laboratory in Woods Hole, MA to continue studying neurobiology. He obtained his MD and PhD both from Georgetown University School of Medicine, and both in 1997. He completed his residency in neurology at Johns Hopkins University's department of neurology in 2001.

== Hannah Poling ==
Hannah, Jon's daughter, was born in 1999 and received five vaccines in one day in 2000 at the age of 19 months; this occurred because she had fallen behind on her vaccine schedule as a result of a series of ear infections. According to Kathleen Seidel, the Poling family filed a case with the National Vaccine Injury Compensation Program on October 25, 2002. In 2006, Jon, along with three other researchers, all of whom were affiliated with Johns Hopkins at the time, published a case report and chart review retrospective series regarding the association of mitochondrial disease and autism in the Journal of Child Neurology. In 2008, after the government conceded his daughter's vaccine injury case, Dr Poling said, “Many in the autism community and their champions believe that the result in this case may well signify a landmark decision as it pertains to children developing autism following vaccinations. This still remains to be seen, but currently there are almost 5,000 other cases pending.” Hannah's case had originally been placed with the almost 5,000 Autism Omnibus cases pending hearing 5 years before her case was conceded administratively.

Others have speculated that in the Poling case, all that was really conceded was that "the vaccines, given to Hannah in 2000, aggravated a pre-existing condition [namely, mitochondrial disease] that then manifested as autism-like symptoms." Similarly, Rahul K. Parikh contended that "...this was not a case of vaccines causing autism. Rather, this is a case where the court deemed it plausible that vaccines aggravated an underlying disease caused by bad mitochondria, and that some of the symptoms Hannah showed were similar to autism", and Julie Gerberding (then CDC director who later went on to be president of Merck Vaccines) said, "Let me be very clear that the government has made absolutely no statement indicating that vaccines are a cause of autism." It has also been noted that Hannah's mitochondrial disease is very rare, and that no evidence proves that it is possible for vaccines to cause or worsen mitochondrial diseases, with Chuck Mohan of the United Mitochondrial Disease Foundation noting that "there is very little scientific research in this area." In addition, Paul Offit has argued that the VICP's concession to Hannah was "poorly reasoned" and contended that this program had "turned its back on science" in recent years. Offit also noted that "whereas it is clear that natural infections can exacerbate symptoms of encephalopathy in patients with mitochondrial enzyme deficiencies, no clear evidence exists that vaccines cause similar exacerbations." Another unclear aspect of Hannah's case is whether she had a pre-existing mitochondrial disorder that vaccinations aggravated, or whether vaccinations caused that disorder. Hannah's mother, Terry Poling, has stated that "The government chose to believe the first theory", but added that "We don’t know that she had an underlying disorder." However, the Polings' neurologist, Andrew Zimmerman, wrote in a letter to the Polings' attorneys that there was a pre-existing mitochondrial dysfunction. Dr. Zimmerman wrote, "The cause for regressive encephalopathy in Hannah at age 19 months was underlying mitochondrial dysfunction, exacerbated by vaccine-induced fever and immune stimulation that exceeded metabolic energy reserves."

On July 21, 2008, Steven Novella posted an article on Neurologica, his blog, in which he briefly mentioned the Poling case, saying, "The case was settled (not judged in Poling’s favor, but settled) because both sides realized it was a special case that could not be extrapolated to other vaccine-autism cases." In response, Dr. Poling wrote a letter to Dr. Novella in which he states, among other things, that "The only thing unique about my little girl’s case is the level of medical documentation--5 to 20% of patients with ASDs have mitochondrial dysfunction." Novella's response to this letter, posted on July 23, 2008, argued that "Hannah Poling’s history has many features that are not typical of autism – like a history of otitis media with frequent fevers, seizures, and what sounds like a rare encephalitis that probably did result from vaccines. Even if we put her mitochondrial mutation aside – this is not a typical case of autism."

On September 3, 2010, autism blogger Matt Carey broke the story about the settlement deal including a $1.5M initial payment and an annuity to cover costs of the life care plan.

== Selected publications ==
- Poling, J. S.; Karanian, J. W.; Salem Jr, N.; Vicini, S. (1995). "Time- and voltage-dependent block of delayed rectifier potassium channels by docosahexaenoic acid". Molecular Pharmacology. 47 (2): 381–390. PMID 7870048.
- Poling, J. S.; Vicini, S.; Rogawski, M. A.; Salem Jr, N. (1996). "Docosahexaenoic acid block of neuronal voltage-gated K+ channels: Subunit selective antagonism by zinc". Neuropharmacology. 35 (7): 969–982. doi:10.1016/0028-3908(96)00127-X. PMID 8938727. S2CID 7362411.
- Poling, J. S.; Rogawski, M. A.; Salem Jr, N.; Vicini, S. (1996). "Anandamide, an endogenous cannabinoid, inhibits Shaker-related voltage-gated K+ channels". Neuropharmacology. 35 (7): 983–991. doi:10.1016/0028-3908(96)00130-X. PMID 8938728. S2CID 34338090.
