= Max Wiznitzer =

American neurologist

Max Wiznitzer is the director of the Rainbow Autism Center at Rainbow Babies and Children's Hospital in Cleveland. He has worked there since 1986. Wiznitzer is also an associate professor of pediatrics and neurology at Case Western Reserve University.

== Early life ==
Wiznitzer was born in Panama and grew up in Chicago. His parents were Jewish and had immigrated to the United States from Romania. From a young age, Wiznitzer was interested in reading about medicine, and often went to the local library to check out books on the topic. Beginning in 5th grade, he never considered any career other than being a doctor. He attended Lane Technical College Prep High School, and became the valedictorian upon his graduation in 1971.

== Education ==
Wiznitzer graduated from Northwestern University with a medical degree, and completed 4 years of training in Cincinnati, 3 years of which were in pediatrics; the other year was in developmental pediatrics. During this time, he met his future wife. He then spent three years training in child neurology at the University of Pennsylvania before finishing up his training with a two-year stint at Albert Einstein College of Medicine, where he studied disorders of higher cortical function in children.

== Autism ==
Wiznitzer argues that the rise in autism rates is due not to a real increase in the disorder's prevalence, but rather due to broadening of the diagnostic criteria, decreasing age at diagnosis, and other non-environmental factors. He has also stated that autistic children often show improvement over time, saying, "Over 3 to 5 years, you see an improvement in communication skills." Wiznitzer also considers autism to have a strong genetic basis, arguing that autism is genetic in about 10 to 15 percent of cases, and is of the firm opinion that vaccines do not cause autism as postulated by Andrew Wakefield in a fraudulent 1998 paper, having said that "If you can't trust the integrity of the researcher, you can't trust the research" while speaking at Marietta College. With regard to this paper, Wiznitzer has stated that although it has been retracted, "his core group of supporters is not going to let the facts dissuade their beliefs that MMR causes autism."

=== Autism omnibus trial ===
In the autism omnibus trial, Wiznitzer reiterated that neither the MMR vaccine nor thimerosal-containing vaccines cause autism, nor do both working together. In this trial, Wiznitzer submitted an expert report in which he contended that there he has not seen any evidence of an epidemic of autism in his clinical practice. He also criticized Marcel Kinsbourne's testimony and report as "speculative and without support," and went on record as saying there was no credible evidence that thimerosal caused autism.
