= Vaccine (disambiguation) =

A vaccine is a biological preparation that provides immunity to an infectious disease.

Vaccine or The Vaccine(s) may also refer to:

- Vaccine (journal), a medical journal
- Vaccine: The Controversial Story of Medicine's Greatest Lifesaver, a 2007 book by Arthur Allen
- Vaccine (instrument), a Haitian musical instrument
- Vaccine (musician), Christine Clements, American dubstep record producer
- "Vaccine" (song), by NoCap
- "Vaccine", a song by Logic from Bobby Tarantino III
- "Vaccine", a song by Mew from No More Stories..., 2009
- "Vaccine", a song by Migos from Culture III
- "The Vaccine" (The Outer Limits), a television episode
- The Vaccines, an English rock band
- COVID-19 vaccine, colloquially referred to as "The Vaccine"

== See also ==
- Vaccination, the process of administering a vaccine
- Vaccine hesitancy, a reluctance or refusal to be vaccinated or to have one's children vaccinated
- Vaxine, a video game
