= Laura Hewitson =

British primatologist (born 1969)

- Born: 1969 (age 56–57); Birmingham, England
- Education: University of Essex; University of York
- Occupations: Affiliate Scientist at Washington National Primate Research Center; Research Director at Johnson Center for Child Health and Development
- Scientific career
- Thesis: Energy metabolism of the trophectoderm and inner cell mass of the mouse blastocyst. (1993)

Laura Charlotte Hewitson is a British-born primate researcher noted for her work in the fields of reproductive biology and behavior. She is an affiliate scientist at the Washington National Primate Research Center (WaNPRC) and an adjunct associate professor of psychiatry at the University of Texas Southwestern Medical Center. Additionally, she is the Research Director of the Johnson Center for Child Health and Development in Austin, Texas. Hewitson was a staff scientist at Oregon Health Sciences University from 1997 to 2001. From 2002 to 2010 she was an associate professor of obstetrics, gynecology and reproductive sciences at the University of Pittsburgh School of Medicine and a member of the Magee-Women's Research Institute and Foundation (MWRI&F) in Pittsburgh, Pennsylvania.

== Education ==
In 1990, Hewitson graduated with honors in biology from the University of Essex. She earned her PhD in biological sciences at the University of York, England, and later moved to the United States in 1994 to pursue postdoctoral training at the University of Wisconsin-Madison.

== Research ==
Hewitson's research has primarily focused on embryo metabolism, cytoskeletal dynamics, centrosome abnormalities during fertilization, assisted reproductive technology (ART) in non-human primates and infant primate neonatal development. More recently, Hewitson's research has focused on understanding genetic and environmental influences that lead to adverse pregnancy outcomes, with special emphasis on autism spectrum disorders (ASD). Her research has been funded through the National Institutes of Health, as well as private foundations.

Hewitson's work on primate fertilization examined the role of the centrosome during assisted reproduction and identified unique check-points during the first cell cycle. She also explored the safety of new methods of assisted reproduction by producing infant primates by ART to follow their early development and behavior (see Selected Publications).

Hewitson's more recent research has focused on the study of genetic versus epigenetic (environmental) causes of neurodevelopmental disorders. While at the University of Pittsburgh she researched the possible connection between pediatric vaccines and behavior and presented some of this research at the International Meeting for Autism Research (IMFAR) in 2008 and the Neurobehavioral Teratology Society (NBTS) meeting in 2011. She is now continuing this research with colleagues at the WaNPRC. Hewitson is also collaborating with colleagues at the University of Texas Southwestern Medical School to identify blood biomarkers for autism. With funding from the Simons Foundation Autism Research Initiative and the Department of Defense Congressionally Directed Medical Research Program (CDMRP),

== Awards and achievements ==
In 2010, Hewitson was the recipient of the Invisible Disabilities Association Honors Research Award for her research in autism.

Hewitson's work has been published in many journals, such as Science, Nature Medicine, Biology of Reproduction, Human Reproduction, Fertility and Sterility, Developmental Psychobiology, Acta Neurobiologiae Experimentalis, Autism Research and Treatment, Journal of Toxicology and Environmental Health, and the Journal of Law, Medicine and Ethics.

== Selected publications ==
- Hewitson, L.C., Leese, H.J. (1993) Energy metabolism of the trophectoderm and inner cell mass of the mouse blastocyst. J Exp Zool. 267:337-343.
- Hewitson, L.C., Martin, K.L., Leese, H.J. (1996) Effects of metabolic inhibitors on mouse preimplantation embryo development and the energy metabolism of isolated inner cell masses. Mol Reprod Dev. 43:323-330.
- Hewitson, L., Simerly, C., Tengowski, M.W, Sutovsky, P., Navara, C.S., Haavisto, A.J. and Schatten, G. (1996) Microtubule and chromatin configurations during rhesus intracytoplasmic sperm injection: Successes and Failures. Biol. Reprod. 55:271–280.
- Hewitson, L., Haavisto A, Simerly C, Jones J and Schatten G (1997) Microtubule organization and chromatin configurations in hamster oocytes during fertilization, parthenogenetic activation and after insemination with human sperm. Biol.Reprod. 57: 967–975.
- Hewitson L, Takahashi D, Dominko T, Simerly C, and Schatten G. (1998) Fertilization and embryo development to blastocysts after intracytoplasmic sperm injection in the rhesus monkey. Hum Reprod 13:3449-3455.
- Schatten G, Hewitson L, Simerly C, Sutovsky P and Huszar G. (1998) Cell and Molecular Biological Challenges of ICSI: A.R.T. Before Science? J Law Med Ethics 26:29-37.
- Hewitson, L, Dominko, T, Takahashi, D, Ramalho-Santos, J, Sutovsky, P, Fanton, J, Jacob, D, Monteith, D, Neuringer, M, Battaglia, D, Simerly, C, and G. Schatten. (1999) Births of ICSI monkeys: unique checkpoints during the first cell cycle of fertilization. Nature Medicine 5:431-433.
- Ramalho-Santos, J., Moreno, R.D., Sutovsky, P., Chan, A.Q.., Hewitson, L., Wessel G.M., Simerly C.R., and Schatten, G. (2000) SNAREs in mammalian sperm: possible implications for fertilization. Dev Bio 223:54-69.
- Hewitson, L., Martinovich, C., Simerly, C., Takahashi, D., Schatten, G. (2002) Intracytoplasmic injection of rhesus testicular sperm (TESE-ICSI) and elongated spermatids (ELSI) results in healthy offspring. Fertil Steril. 77:794-801.
- Simerly, C., Dominko, T., Navara, C., Payne, C., Capuano, S., Gosman, G., Chong, K.Y., Compton, D., Hewitson, L., and Schatten, G. (2000) Molecular Correlates of Primate Nuclear Transfer Failures. Science 300: 297–299.
- Dettmer, AM, Houser, LA, Ruppenthal, GC, Capuano, S, Hewitson, L. (2007) Growth and developmental outcomes of three high-risk infant rhesus macaques (Macaca mulatta). Am J Primatol. 69: 503–518.
- Hewitson, L., Lopresti, B., Mason, N.S, Stott, C. and Tomko, J. (2010) Influence of pediatric vaccines on amygdala growth and opioid ligand binding in rhesus macaque infants: A pilot study. Acta Neurobiologiae Exp 70: 147–164.
- Bharathi S. Gadad, Laura Hewitson, Keith A. Young, and Dwight C. German, "Neuropathology and Animal Models of Autism: Genetic and Environmental Factors," Autism Research and Treatment, vol. 2013, Article ID 731935, 12 pages, 2013. doi:10.1155/2013/731935
- Schutte C, Hewitson L. Relationship between Stereotyped Behaviors and Restricted Interests (SBRIs) measured on the Autism Diagnostic Observation Schedule (ADOS) and diagnostic results. Open Access Autism 2014 Aug 11;2(2):15.
- Curtis B, Liberato N, Rulien M, Morrisroe K, Kenney C, Yutuc V, Ferrier C, Marti CN, Mandell D, Burbacher TM, Sackett GP, Hewitson L. Examination of the Safety of Pediatric Vaccine Schedules in a Non-Human Primate Model: Assessments of Neurodevelopment, Learning, and Social Behavior. Environmental Health Perspectives, Feb 18, 2015
