= Arthur Krigsman =

American physician

Arthur Krigsman is a pediatrician and gastroenterologist best known for his controversial research in which he attempted to prove that the MMR vaccine caused autism. He specializes in the evaluation and treatment of gastrointestinal pathology in autistic children, and has written in support of the diagnosis he calls autistic enterocolitis. The original study that tied the MMR vaccine to autism and GI complaints conducted by one of Krigsman's associates has been found to be fraudulent, and the diagnosis of "autistic enterocolitis" has not been accepted by the medical community.

== Education and career ==
A graduate of Johns Hopkins University, Krigsman earned his Doctor of Medicine at the State University of New York Downstate College of Medicine at Brooklyn in 1989 and later completed his pediatric residency at SUNY Brooklyn's Kings County Medical Center. After completing pediatric gastroenterology fellowship in 1995, he joined the Department of Pediatric Gastroenterology of Beth Israel Medical Center in New York as Director through 2000, and later joined Lenox Hill Hospital from 2000 through 2004 in the same position. He subsequently left to work as director of the gastroenterology clinic at Thoughtful House, where he was colleagues with Andrew Wakefield. Krigsman holds board certification in general pediatrics and in pediatric gastroenterology, though no longer practices general pediatrics. In April 2010, Krigsman left Thoughtful House to open a private practice in Austin and New York.

== Ethics ==
In 2004, Krigsman left Lenox Hill under "questionable circumstances", after his hospital privileges were restricted from conducting endoscopies due to allegations that he was performing medically unwarranted endoscopies on autistic children for research purposes. The Department of Health and Human Services Office for Human Research Protections later reviewed the situation, noting reports from the hospital that Krigsman applied for permission to conduct research but was not approved by the institution's Institutional Review Board, which was concerned about risk to patients from unwarranted procedures. The report also noted Krigsman nevertheless testified before a Congressional hearing about research he had done on 43 patients, and later refused to provide medical charts as requested by a committee set up by the hospital to investigate the situation, before resigning from the hospital in 2004.

In 2005, Krigsman was fined by the Texas State Board of Medical Examiners for multiple violations, including representing he was available to see patients prior to obtaining his medical license in Texas, for failing to report previous regulatory sanctions by the Florida medical board, and for the disciplinary action by the Lenox Hill Hospital.

== Controversial autism research ==
The term "autistic enterocolitis" was coined by Andrew Wakefield in 1998 after the publication of his now-retracted study in The Lancet, in which he purported an association between autistic regression, intestinal inflammation and the MMR vaccine. In 2003, Krigsman, who was at Lenox Hill, reported similar findings as those of Wakefield, saying he found the intestines of 40 autistic children showed signs of inflammation, thus lending support to Wakefield's ideas that MMR was related to autism and also to gastrointestinal disease. This information was not formally published until seven years later in 2010, in the non-MEDLINE indexed journal Autism Insights. In April 2016, Da Capo Lifelong published the memoir of a mother with two autistic children, which heavily featured Krigsman and detailed his treatment protocol from the patient perspective.

However, the concept of "autistic enterocolitis" has not been accepted in the medical community due to lack of rigorous studies confirming the condition, as many studies purportedly showing this diagnosis have been marred by numerous methodological faults. Even a position statement by a panel of physicians sponsored by Autism Speaks that included Krigsman concluded that the clinical significance of the findings of inflammation in the intestines is unknown as it is also found in non-autistic children.

Andrew Wakefield, who later joined and worked with Krigsman at Thoughtful House, was found to have falsified the 1998 Lancet study, which was described as "an elaborate fraud".

== Expert witness testimony ==
Krigsman has testified as an expert witness in a number of test claims to the Office of Special Masters of the U.S. Court of Federal Claims (commonly known as the "Vaccine Court") by parents seeking compensation for damages purportedly caused by vaccination. The "Special Masters" rendering decisions about these cases have questioned his credibility due to previous regulatory sanctions by the Texas Medical Board and Lenox Hill Hospital, as well as concerns regarding the curriculum vitae provided by Krigsman. They noted concerns regarding a title he said he held at New York University Medical School which may not have matched his duties as well as possible misrepresentations of publications he has published. In one case, the judge noted that he thinks Krigsman was not a "credible witness" and that the parents who brought the case were "misled by physicians who are guilty, in my view, of gross medical misjudgment". In another case, the judge noted of Krigsman's qualification for identifying a new disease like "autistic enterocolitis" which is "unrecognized by other authorities in the field, were, even when inflated, sadly lacking" and that his testimony about the existence of "autistic enterocolitis" was "speculative and unsupported by the weight of the evidence".

== Selected publications ==
- Russo, A. J.; Krigsman, A.; Jepson, B.; Wakefield, A. (2009). "Low serum myeloperoxidase in autistic children with gastrointestinal disease". Clinical and Experimental Gastroenterology. 2: 85–94. doi:10.2147/CEG.S6051. PMC 3108639. PMID 21694831.
- Russo, A. J.; Krigsman, A.; Jepson, B.; Wakefield, A. (2009). "Decreased Serum Hepatocyte Growth Factor (HGF) in Autistic Children with Severe Gastrointestinal Disease". Biomarker Insights. 4: 181–190. doi:10.4137/BMI.S3656. PMC 2796865. PMID 20029653.
- Walker, S. J.; Fortunato, J.; Gonzalez, L. G.; Krigsman, A. (2013). Hu, Wenhui (ed.). "Identification of Unique Gene Expression Profile in Children with Regressive Autism Spectrum Disorder (ASD) and Ileocolitis". PLOS ONE. 8 (3) e58058. Bibcode:2013PLoSO...858058W. doi:10.1371/journal.pone.0058058. PMC 3592909. PMID 23520485.
