= Allochiria =

Neurological disorder with transposition of sensations

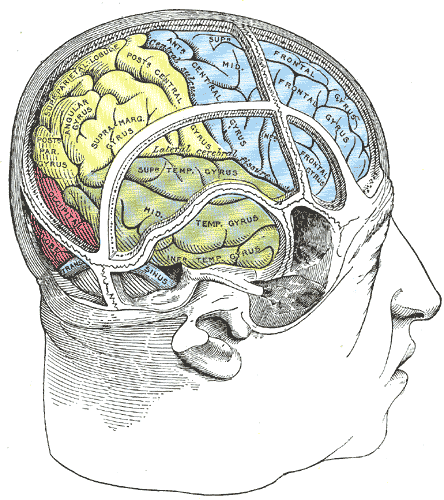
- Allochiria is most frequently associated with a lesion of the right parietal lobe (in yellow, at top)
- Pronunciation: /ˌæləˈkaɪriə/
- Specialty: Neurology

Allochiria is a neurological disorder in which the patient responds to stimuli presented to one side of their body as if the stimuli had been presented at the opposite side. It is associated with spatial transpositions, usually symmetrical, of stimuli from one side of the body (or of the space) to the opposite one. Thus a touch to the left side of the body will be reported as a touch to the right side, which is also known as somatosensory allochiria. If the auditory or visual senses are affected, sounds (a person's voice for instance) will be reported as being heard on the opposite side to that on which they occur and objects presented visually will be reported as having been presented on the opposite side. Often patients may express allochiria in their drawing while copying an image. Allochiria often co-occurs with unilateral neglect and, like hemispatial neglect, the disorder arises commonly from damage to the right parietal lobe.

Allochiria is often confused with alloesthesia, also known as false allochiria. True allochiria is a symptom of dyschiria and unilateral neglect. Dyschiria is a disorder in the localization of sensation due to various degrees of dissociation and cause impairment in one side causing the inability to tell which side of the body was touched. The term is from the Greek meaning "other hand". (Note: from allos lit. 'other' and kheir lit. 'hand')

== Definitional criteria ==
Parietal lobe (red).

Allochiria has been observed mainly in the context of neglect which is usually due to a lesion that affects the right parietal lobe. In patients with allochiria, their sensibility is retained completely but the patient is not clear as to which side of the body has been touched. Their power of localization is retained but error exists to the side touched and they often refer the irritation to the corresponding part of the limb. In the patients' mind there is doubt or error as to which side of the body is touched.

There are multiple definitions of allochiria. According to Musser, allochiria is the reference of a sensory stimulus to the corresponding location on the opposite location on the opposite side of the body. Judson Bury says that a patient may refer to an impression on one side to a corresponding place on the opposite side of the body. Thus, if a patient is pricked on one limb, he may say that he feels it on the other. Overall, even though different author's definition differs on points such as the type of stimulus, and the symmetry between the site of the stimulus and the seat of its localization, they all agree that an essential feature of allochiria is the deflection of a sensation to the wrong side of the body, which is true allochiria. In none of these definitions is any stress laid on the state of the patient's knowledge of a right or left side and the symptoms are seen as an error in localization.

Obsersteiner laid stress that there is in allochiria no defect in vertical localization but merely confusion in the patient's mind between the opposite sides of the body and come to look upon the symptom as simply any form of bad mistake in localization. There is in the patient's mind doubt or error as to the side touched while sensibility including the power of localization is otherwise retained. Allochiria has been described as occurring in nerve lesions, Hemiplegia, disseminated sclerosis Multiple sclerosis, tabes dorsalis, unilateral injury to the spinal cord, Ménière's disease, hysteria, symmetrical gangrene, and in connection with touch, pain, the "muscle sense," the temperature sense, sight, smell, taste, hearing, and the electrical reactions.

Allochiria can occur in relation to any or every segment of the body. In some cases allochiria may be bilateral, and in others it may be restricted to certain regions of the body, or even only to one part of the body. Allochiria is marked to have connections with a variety of senses and sometimes only certain kinds of stimuli can arouse the appropriate feeling of one sidedness.

== Types ==
=== Electromotor allochiria ===
This is seen when there is a cross of electrical reflexes as a muscle is stimulated. Electromotor allochiria has been observed in the face, lower limbs, and upper limbs. In these cases, a stimulus presented on the affected side caused contraction of the opposite facial muscles with a current so weak that the healthy facial did not react. Another example is that pressure on one forearm caused movement of the opposite forearm. The central fact is that an electrical stimulus may manifest its effect at a distant part of the nervous system. This distant part may be on the same side of the body or on the opposite side, naturally it is more often on the opposite side because the representation of corresponding contralateral limbs in the spinal cord are nearer to each other than homolateral limbs. This has nothing to do with the confusion of the two sides that occurs in the patients mind when allochiria is present.

=== Motor allochiria ===
If patient asked to carry out a movement on effect side he does so with the corresponding part of the opposite side fully under the impression that he has correctly performed the required movement.

=== Reflex allochiria ===
Patients with reflex allochiria respond to a stimulation of the sole of the foot or in the inner part of the thigh as being evoked as the corresponding reflex on the opposite side only.

=== Auditory allochiria ===
In cases of auditory allochiria, observations recorded that when a tuning fork was held constantly to one ear, the patient responded with a series of symptoms, including pain and deafness, in the opposite ear.

=== Visual allochiria ===
In visual allochiria, objects situated on one side of the visual field are perceived in the contralateral visual field. In one of the two cases ever recorded, the visual impression received by the right open eye was regularly referred to the left eye, and the patient maintained that she perceived the impression with the left eye that in fact was shut. In the other case, a colored object held in front of the left eye was recognized and the patient maintained that she saw the color with the right eye.

=== Gustatory allochiria ===
In a case of gustatory allochiria, a substance placed on one side of the tongue was said to have been tasted on the opposite side. Also, touches on that side of the tongue were also referred to the opposite side. In this type of allochiria, it is difficult to see how one can in this case dissociate the reference of taste from that of touch.

== Alloesthesia ==
Alloesthesia (or allesthesia from Greek άλλος, allos "other" + αίσθησις, aisthesis "perception") is also known as "false allochiria" and many dictionaries list the same definition as allochiria and even give same Greek lexical roots. The term allesthesia was introduced by T. Grainger Stewart in an article published in the British Medical Journal in 1894. The cases that Stewart found were mainly related to sensation and he observed consistent horizontal movement. Alloesthesia is a case of mistaken or incomplete perception of a stimulus and maybe accompanied by other failures in perception such as defective localization. In a case-study, in which the condition was incorrectly described as allochiria, a stimulus applied to the inside of the cheek was referred to the outside. In another case, a touch to the index finger was referred to the thumb. False allochiria may occur in bilateral affections of nerves such as multiple neuritis, and although no such case has yet been recorded it is still clear that the condition above is not related to allochiria.

== Dyschiria ==
In dyschiria the failure to determine the correct side is a specific failure and is quite independent of any other failure as regards to perception of stimulus. In other words, the patient may recognize every single feature concerning a single stimulus—its precise nature, position, etc.—except the one point of its side. Evidence goes to show that there is present a mental defect of the specific feeling. Dyschiria has many forms which include achiria, allochiria, and synchiria.

=== Achiria ===
Achiria is referred to as simple allochiria and is the term proposed to show the failure to regard feelings of sidedness or handedness. Achiria has sensory, motor, and introspective components. For the sensory achiria, a stimulus applied to the affected part arouses no feeling of sidedness. The stimulus is presented to the side of the body that the person with the disorder has no notion. For the motor component, if a patient is asked to carry out any movement with the limb in question he is unable to do so unless is indicated in some other way than by the use of the words right and left. Reason for this is that he has lost the knowledge of the meaning of these words either altogether or at all events when they are applied to limbs concerned. For the introspective component a patient loses memory for feeling of part of the body that the stimulus is presented and declares that though he knows he has a part he cannot feel it.

=== Allochiria ===
Allochiria is when a stimuli presented on one side is constantly referred to the corresponding point of the opposite side. Allochiria has sensory, motor, and introspective manifestations. In sensory cases, a point to which they are referred on the opposite side corresponds exactly with the symmetrical point touched at fact which in itself disposes of the view that allochiria is in any way merely a disturbance of localization. For cases of motor allochiria, if a patient is asked to carry out a movement on effect side, he does so with the corresponding part of the opposite side fully under the impression that he has correctly performed the required movement. For the introspective cases the patient can appreciate a given feeling of sidedness only when the opposite limb is moved or stimulated.

=== Synchiria ===
Synchiria is a form of dyschiria in which a stimulus applied to one side of the body is felt on both sides. Synchiria has sensory, motor, and introspective signs. The sensory component refers to a stimulus applied to the affected part evokes two simultaneous sensations which are referred to the corresponding points on both sides of the body. The motor symptom is when a patient is asked to carry out movement on affected side he does so on both sides though in doing so he gets only the feeling of sidedness of the affected part. The introspective component shows that a patient is unable to appreciate the affected feeling of sidedness alone apart from the simultaneously appreciated feeling of the corresponding opposite side though he can appreciate it when he moves both limbs together under the impression that he is moving only the affected one.

== Experiences ==
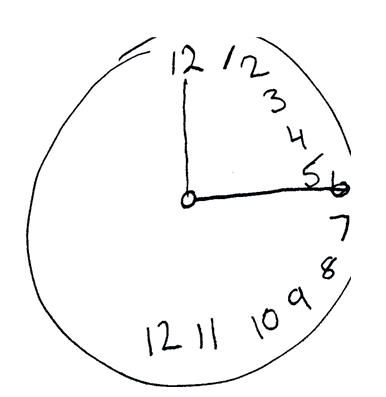
Drawing of a clock by a subject with hemispatial neglect allochiria

There are many cases that patients have shown symptoms of allochiria. Allochiria in constructional tasks is commonly seen when neglect patients transpose the elements on the left side to the right side but fail to see or fix their mistakes. Some cases in which patients have shown allochiria is in copying and drawing clocks from memory. A defect of mental representations may lead the patients to transpose all the elements to the ipsilesional side in drawing tasks. In these drawing and memory tasks, patients with allochiria have a tendency to place all of the hours to the right half of the clock. There are different kinds of spatial transpositions that exist in these drawing tasks in patients with allochiria.

The figure shows an example of allochiria in the clock drawing of a patient with hemispatial neglect. The patient omitted the left side of objects when drawing a clock. Even though the patient could verbally express that the clock face has a left side, he or she would fail to notice that the drawing was incomplete. This implies that drawing tasks can play an important role in differentiating the specific impairment of the brain lesion, and not just saying that a patient has dementia.

== Diagnosis ==
When diagnosing allochiria, it is important to consider the sensory and the motor aspects of the problem. In absence of knowledge there are a number of ways in which the various symptoms may be overlooked or misinterpreted and as the condition goes frequently unrecognized. One rare example in medicine that causes a wrong diagnosis of allochiria is due to the unawareness of a few simple facts than to any failure in judgment. It is evident that the details of the sensory symptoms get overlooked when testing a patient's localizing capacity. The observer neglects to inquire expressly as to the side to which the sensation is referred. This is evident when patients with allochiria show no fault in sensorial perception and localization. However, even if the patient mentions the wrong side, it is sometimes being just regarded as a slip of the tongue and matter may not be pursued any further. Looking at the motor aspect of allochiria, the symptoms again are described in a misleading way because the symptoms are less obvious. Unless motor manifestations are carefully analyzed, they may be interpreted as clumsiness or weakness. Moreover, when patients complained of weakness and awkwardness of right side—examinations apparently confirmed that the truth of this statement and defect was marked as acts consciously performed and was present only in relation to such acts. If a patient says that he cannot tell on which side the certain stimulus is applied—existence of allochiria is confirmed, provided that sensibility is intact.

=== Diagnostic value ===
Allochiria represents a psychical affection and the occurrence of any form of allochiria should be regarded as a positive indication of the presence of hysteria. Recognition of the allochiria may throw light upon a number of symptoms that would otherwise be misinterpreted as paresis, aboulia, and defective sensibility. This enables a correct analysis to be made of the precise defects present and serve as a guide toward the original focus of the whole affection and proving an important step in the exact psychological diagnosis that is an essential preliminary to the scientific treatment of hysteria.

== Theory ==
There are multiple theories that explain the outcome of allochiria. The current and most widely accepted explanation of allochiria is Hammond's Theory. This theory assumes that there is an almost complete decussation of sensory fibers within the grey matter. He concludes that with a lesion on one posterior side, this would reach center in the corresponding hemisphere, and thus, the sensation is then referred by this hemisphere to the opposite side of the body. Hammond goes on to say that if another unilateral lesion supervened at a different level from the first, the sensation that was previously deflected to the wrong hemisphere was now redirected by meeting with another obstacle and so arrived at its proper hemisphere. Allochiria occurs equally with unilateral and bilateral lesions as long as they are asymmetrical. Another theory is Huber's theory which assumes that an appearance of a new lesion on the opposite side from that of the block redirecting the impulse towards its original destination. Disappearance of symptoms due to retrogression of the lesion and track are cleared.

== See also ==
- Apraxia
- Hemispatial neglect
- Synesthesia
- Hemiplegia
- Hysteria
- Agnosia
- Brain damage
