= Doctor's Data =

Doctor's Data, Inc. is a clinical laboratory based in St. Charles, Illinois that is often used by practitioners of alternative medicine.

== History ==
Founded in 1972, the company was originally known as Bio Medical Data, Inc. until the early 1980s, when it changed its name to Doctor's Data. It was originally owned by Miller Pharmacal, which was founded by John J. Miller, former research chemist for J.B. Roerig, which was purchased in 1953 by Pfizer. Miller died in 1977, and three owners took control of the company with Ted Lueken as president.

== Controversy ==
Doctor's Data has proven controversial because of the four lawsuits that have been filed by people who say that the company victimized them by diagnosing them as having toxic metal poisoning based on their urinalysis tests, and then prescribing them chelation therapy. According to Patricia Callahan, the problem with these tests and the way they are interpreted is that, after administering a chelator to their patients, "Doctor's Data...compared those drug-provoked results to a reference range calculated for people who had never been given a chelation drug." In addition, they have faced considerable criticism from Stephen Barrett, who has described how provoked urine test reports are used to mislead patients. and has also written negatively about hair analysis in general, which he contends is "unscientific, economically wasteful, and probably illegal." Arthur Allen has also criticized the methodology of their urinalysis tests, saying that they "...present the results [from their urine analysis tests] in such a way that it almost guarantees a finding of "toxicity" for each child." In response to this criticism, Doctor's Data president Ted Lueken argued that "the technique can be valuable when used along with other tests and a doctor's knowledge of his patient." Doctor's Data later sued Barrett on June 18, 2010, accusing him of "...harm[ing] Doctor's Data by transmitting false, fraudulent and defamatory information about this company in a variety of ways" in his writings about the company.
