= Paul Ashwood =

British academic

- Born: United Kingdom
- Education: University College London, Imperial College London, King's College London
- Awards: Suzanne and Bob Wright Trailblazer Award
- Scientific career
- Fields: Gastroenterology, child psychiatry, neuroimmunology
- Workplaces: MIND Institute
- Thesis: Microparticles and the intestine (2001)

Paul Ashwood is an associate professor of immunology at the MIND Institute at the University of California Davis. His lab conducts research regarding the potential role of immune system disorders in autism, as well as other neurodevelopmental disorders such as Fragile X syndrome, Tourette syndrome, schizophrenia and mood disorders.

Ashwood originally conducted research on the gastrointestinal pathology observed in some autistic children. According to a press release from the MIND Institute, his research has concluded that differences exist in immune responses between autistic and neurotypical children. With regard to one such study, presented at the International Meeting for Autism Research in 2005, Ashwood said, "We would like to take these findings and explore whether, for example, the cytokine differences are specific to certain subsets of patients with autism, such as those with early onset, or those who exhibit signs of autism later during development", and that "We known these autistic children differ from the normal - what we have to find now is whether they also differ from children with other developmental disabilities."

Ashwood co-authored chapter 10 of a textbook on immune system disorders; in this chapter he states, based on a number of peer-reviewed papers, that "these findings point to a pivotal role for immune-dysregulation in the pathogenesis of ASD". Another of his studies, presented at the International Congress on Autoimmunity, also in 2005, came to a similar conclusion. However, Ashwood noted that "a lot of these reports are conflicting, and there is no consensus so far". Ashwood's lab has also published a number of studies concluding that maternal antibodies are a risk factor for autism. Another of Ashwood's studies, published in 2011, was, along with two other MIND Institute studies, named among the top 10 autism research achievements of that year by Autism Speaks, and yet another study provided evidence that levels of cellular adhesion molecules in the blood are lower in patients with autism than in controls.

According to investigative journalist Brian Deer, Ashwood was formerly one of anti-vaccine activist Andrew Wakefield's colleagues at Royal Free Hospital, and received over £8,000 as a result of his serving as a paid witness in MMR vaccine litigation.
