= Omnibus Autism Proceeding =

Set of test cases examining link between vaccines and autism

The Omnibus Autism Proceeding was a set of six test cases heard by Special Masters of the United States Court of Federal Claims to examine claims of a causal link between vaccines and autism.

Because there were so many National Vaccine Injury Compensation Program (NVICP) cases that involve a claim that vaccines caused autism, over 5000 of them in fact, the attorneys for the plaintiffs and the Special Masters agreed to examine three test cases to determine if there were sufficient evidence to support a link between vaccines and autism. They directly confronted the claim of whether there is evidence of causality between vaccines and autism.

In 2002, the NVICP, in consultation with a Petitioners Steering Committee, set up the Omnibus Autism Proceeding to aggregate these cases. They decided to examine six test cases that made one or more of the following claims about the vaccines-autism link:

• Claims that MMR vaccines and other thimerosal-containing vaccines can combine to cause autism.
• Claims that center on vaccines containing thimerosal causing autism.
• Claims that MMR vaccines alone (with no mention of thimerosal) can cause autism.

Three Special Masters examined the evidence for each of those claims. In 2009, they handed down their decisions. For each claim, the three Special Masters concluded that there were no links between vaccines and autism.
