= Arthur Allen (author) =

American author and freelance journalist (born 1959)

Arthur Allen (born 1959 in Cincinnati, Ohio) is an American author and journalist.

== Education ==
Allen graduated from the University of California, Berkeley in 1981 with an AB in development studies.

== Career ==
Since 1995, Allen has mainly written about biology and medicine. He became a freelance writer in 1996, writing articles for a variety of publications, including the Washington Post, the New York Times Magazine, the New Republic, Mother Jones, Redbook and the Washington Independent. In 2007, his book Vaccine: The Controversial Story of Medicine's Greatest Lifesaver was published by W. W. Norton. Additional books he has written include Ripe: The Search For The Perfect Tomato (2011), and The Fantastic Laboratory of Dr. Weigl (2014). In 2014, Allen joined the Staff of Politico as eHealth editor, writing and editing stories about heath IT. In 2020, he left Politico and became an editor at Kaiser Family Foundation Health News.

== Personal life ==
Allen is married to The New Yorker writer Margaret Talbot, with whom he has a son and a daughter.
