= Vijendra K. Singh =

Neuroimmunologist

Vijendra Kumar Singh
- Education: Lucknow University, University of British Columbia
- Awards: O. Spurgeon English Humanitarian Award
- Scientific career
- Workplaces: Utah State University, University of Michigan College of Pharmacy
- Thesis: Studies on brain nuclear RNA polymerase and chromatin transcription (1972)

Vijendra Kumar Singh is a neuroimmunologist who formerly held a post at Utah State University, prior to which he was a professor at the University of Michigan. While affiliated with both institutions, he conducted some controversial autism-related research focusing on the potential role of immune system disorders in the etiology of autism. For example, he has testified before a United States congressional committee that, in his view, "three quarters of autistic children suffer from an autoimmune disease."

== Career ==
Singh originally worked at a children's hospital in Vancouver, and is the author of over 100 scientific publications. The original focus of his research was neurochemistry, but his interest in the role of the immune system in neurodevelopmental disorders was sparked after reading an article on the mind-body relationship, which proposed a biological mechanism to explain the signaling taking place both in the brain and in the immune system. In 2004, Singh gave a talk before the Institute of Medicine in which he recommended testing for immune disorders before vaccinating children, a proposal which was declined, according to Singh, because of its high cost (almost $100 per child). As of 2009 he was working at the Brain State International Research Center in Scottsdale, Arizona. He is currently affiliated with Neuro Immune Biotechnology Solutions, as the organization's scientific director. He is also a member of the Autism Autoimmunity Project.

== Research ==
In 1998, Singh, while affiliated with the University of Michigan, coauthored a paper in Clinical Immunology and Immunopathology reporting the presence of antibodies to myelin basic protein in autistic children and arguing that a virally triggered autoimmune response might cause autism. In 2002, Singh et al. published a paper in the Journal of Biomedical Science in which it was reported that 75 of 125 autistic children had an abnormal measles antibody, whereas none of the non-autistic children did. In addition, the study concluded that "...an inappropriate antibody response to MMR, specifically the measles component thereof, might be related to pathogenesis of autism." The results were reported on by the Daily Telegraph, which noted that the study did not prove that the MMR vaccine caused autism; rather, "autism may be responsible for the unusual response to the MMR antibodies." In 2005, Singh claimed greater awareness of autism by healthcare providers could not explain the rise in diagnoses and said he believed autism was "caused by a virus-induced autoimmune reaction."

Singh's findings on autism have been criticized by other scientists as flawed, unreproducible, or dubious. Mary Ramsay of the Health Protection Agency wrote that the evidence for the "specific" MMR-type antibody Singh claims to have detected was "not credible." Paul Offit wrote in Autism's False Prophets that "...a closer look at Singh's science revealed two critical flaws: children with autism didn't have evidence of nerve cell damage, and, according to measles experts, the test that Singh had used to detect measles antibodies didn't actually detect them." A 2006 review of literature on vaccines and autism found that Singh's results "have been called into question due to issues of cross-contamination, as well as the use of unsubstantiated and un-validated biochemical techniques", citing a report by the World Health Organization, and a number of other studies have failed to find a difference in immune response to the measles virus between autistic and neurotypical children. Peter Lachmann, the president of the Academy of Medical Sciences, United Kingdom, stated: "Singh's work in these papers is not particularly reproducible or good... There are many diseases which show raised antibodies to measles, for example chronic active hepatitis or multiple sclerosis, yet there is nothing to associate these with MMR. There is no persuasive evidence that autism is caused by autoimmunity."

== Testimony ==
In 2000, Singh testified before the Committee on Government Reform, led by Dan Burton, regarding the potential role of autoimmunity as a cause of autism. Part of his testimony centered on his findings of brain autoantibodies in autistic children.

== Alternative autism therapies ==
As of 2006, Singh endorsed the treatment of autism with nutraceuticals, transfer factors and glyconutrients. As of 2004, Singh "recommend[ed] treating autistic children with a range of immunological treatments, including steroids, intravenous immunoglobulin, plasmapheresis, and sphingomyelin."

== Selected publications ==
- Singh V. K., Lin SX, Newell E, Nelson C. (2002). "Abnormal measles-mumps-rubella antibodies and CNS autoimmunity in children with autism". Journal of Biomedical Science. 9 (4): 359–64. doi:10.1007/BF02256592. PMID 12145534.
- Singh, V. K.; Warren, R. P.; Odell, J. D.; Warren, W. L.; Cole, P. (1993). "Antibodies to Myelin Basic Protein in Children with Autistic Behavior". Brain, Behavior, and Immunity. 7 (1): 97–103. doi:10.1006/brbi.1993.1010. PMID 7682457. S2CID 34514269.
- Singh, V. K.; Warren, R.; Averett, R.; Ghaziuddin, M. (1997). "Circulating autoantibodies to neuronal and glial filament proteins in autism". Pediatric Neurology. 17 (1): 88–90. doi:10.1016/S0887-8994(97)00045-3. PMID 9308986.
- Singh, V. K. (1996). "Plasma increase of interleukin-12 and interferon-gamma. Pathological significance in autism". Journal of Neuroimmunology. 66 (1–2): 143–145. doi:10.1016/0165-5728(96)00014-8. PMID 8964908. S2CID 3794830.

== Bibliography ==
- Fitzpatrick, Michael (2004). MMR and Autism: What Parents Need To Know. Routledge. p. 90. ISBN 978-1134355914.
- Offit, Paul (2008). Autism's False Prophets. Columbia University Press. p. 45. ISBN 978-0-231-14636-4.
