= International Meeting for Autism Research =

Annual scientific conference

- Genre: scientific conference
- Frequency: Annually each spring
- Inaugurated: November 2001
- Most recent: May 2019
- Website: http://autism-insar.org/imfar-annual-meeting/imfar

The International Meeting for Autism Research, or IMFAR for short, is an annual meeting held each spring by the International Society for Autism Research. The 2019 meeting was held in Montreal. The 2015 meeting was in Salt Lake City. The 2014 meeting was held in Atlanta from May 14 to 17. In 2013, IMFAR was held in San Sebastian, Spain.

It describes its goals as "to promote exchange and dissemination of the latest scientific findings and to stimulate research progress in understanding the nature, causes, and treatments for ASD." Presenters have included Laura Hewitson of the Johnson Center for Child Health and Development, as well as Irva Hertz-Picciotto, who was the session chair for a session about environmental exposures and autism. The keynote speakers have included Christopher Gillberg, Geraldine Dawson and Paul Ashwood of the MIND Institute. Another paper presented there focused on the prevalence of autoantibodies to folate receptors in autistic children, and found that about 75% of children with autism had such antibodies. This paper, coauthored by Richard E. Frye and Dan Rossignol, among others, would later be published in Molecular Psychiatry.
