= Vaccine: The Controversial Story of Medicine's Greatest Lifesaver =

Book by Arthur Allen

- First edition
- Author: Arthur Allen
- Language: English
- Subject: Vaccines, vaccine controversies
- Genre: Nonfiction
- Publisher: W.W. Norton & Company
- Publication date: January 15, 2007
- Publication place: United States
- Pages: 512
- ISBN: 0393059111

Vaccine: The Controversial Story of Medicine's Greatest Lifesaver is a 2007 book by freelance writer Arthur Allen. The book describes the history of vaccination, beginning in 1796 when the smallpox vaccine was pioneered by Edward Jenner, and including mandatory vaccination policies during World War II in the United States military. It ends with a discussion of the vaccine-autism controversy.

== Summary ==
The book begins by describing how George W. Bush received the smallpox vaccine in 2002, given that it was thought, by Bush and his aides, that enemies of the US government, particularly Saddam Hussein, might possess the virus. It then describes how this vaccine was only slightly different from the type invented by Edward Jenner two centuries earlier, which was so successful that smallpox became the first and only disease to ever be eradicated. Vaccine developers profiled in the book include Jonas Salk (p. 188) and Maurice Hilleman (p. 238). Allen, later in the book, describes the controversy over vaccines and autism and the founding of SafeMinds, writing, "The vaccines-cause-autism mindset was the product of a set of assumptions that were impossible to completely prove or disprove." (p. 374) It also discusses how preliminary study results by Thomas Verstraeten which showed that thimerosal might increase children's risk of neurodevelopmental delays were flawed, and how these results were discussed at the 2000 Simpsonwood CDC conference. (p. 404)

== Reviews ==
The book received a positive review from David Oshinsky in the New York Times. It also received a positive review in the Journal of the Royal Society of Medicine, where Michael Fitzpatrick wrote that Allen "does not ignore the history of vaccine disasters. He includes the fiasco in the US military in 1942, when yellow fever vaccine contaminated with hepatitis B caused 100 deaths, and the mass vaccination against smallpox in New York in 1947 that caused six deaths (four more than the outbreak itself). In the Cutter incident in the 1950s, inadequately inactivated polio vaccine caused 164 cases of paralysis and 10 deaths. While acknowledging these failures, Allen pays tribute to immunization authorities — such as Henry Kempe and Bob Chen — who have campaigned to improve vaccine safety." Another favorable review appeared in The Guardian, where Mark Honigsbaum wrote, "One of the joys of reading Allen's well-researched but never boring 500-page history is that he pricks both camps, taking a critical look at both the anti-vaccinists' championing of pseudo-science and the medical establishment's repeated tendency to downplay the genuine dangers of vaccine side-effects." It was also reviewed in the Journal of Clinical Investigation, where William A. Paxton wrote that it was "a timely and heavily researched book that intelligently and thoughtfully takes the reader through the fusion of the above factors [i.e. the history of vaccine development]." Another review appeared in the New England Journal of Medicine, written by Samuel L. Katz of Duke University's Medical School. Katz wrote, "...I found his [Allen's] writing well balanced, and he includes more information about opponents of vaccines than one usually finds in similar sources." In addition, Rebecca Skloot of the Columbia Journalism Review wrote that, until Allen's book was published, "no book had so carefully and clearly catalogued the history of immunization".
