= Cancer Immunology, Immunotherapy =

- Discipline: Immunotherapy, oncology
- Language: English
- Edited by: G. Pawelec, S. Ostrand-Rosenberg

Publication details
- Former name(s): Cancer Immunology and Immunotherapy
- History: 1976-present
- Publisher: Springer Science+Business Media
- Frequency: Monthly
- Open access: Hybrid
- Impact factor: 6.968 (2020)

Standard abbreviations
- ISO 4: Cancer Immunol. Immunother.

Indexing
- CODEN: CIIMDN
- ISSN: 0340-7004 (print); 1432-0851 (web)
- OCLC no.: 643627785

Links
- Journal homepage; Online archive

Cancer Immunology, Immunotherapy is a monthly peer-reviewed medical journal published by Springer Science+Business Media. According to the Journal Citation Reports, the journal has a 2020 impact factor of 6.968. As of 2024, the impact factor is 4.8.

Immunology includes the use of certain components of the immune system ( antibodies, cells & cytokines), etc. for the treatment of various cancers and autoimmune diseases and the manipulation of immune system through vaccines for the prevention and treatment of infectious and allergic diseases.

What Kind of cancer does immunotherapy treat?

Immunotherapy is a promising treatment option for advanced lung cancer, alone or in combination with conventional treatments like chemotherapy or surgery. Several FDA- approved immunotherapies offer treatment options to children and adults with Hodgkin and non-Hodgkin lymphoma.

Can you survive cancer with immunotherapy?

Immunotherapy has shown success in 15 different types of cancers including lung cancer, head and neck cancer, bladder cancer, kidney cancer, and Hodgkin lymphoma.
