= Marcel Kinsbourne =

Austrian-born pediatric neurologist and cognitive neuroscientist

Marcel Kinsbourne (3 November 1931 – 21 April 2024) was an Austrian-born pediatric neurologist and cognitive neuroscientist who was an early pioneer in the study of brain lateralization.

== Background ==
Kinsbourne was born in Vienna, Austria on 3 November 1931. He obtained his M.D. degree (styled B.M., BCh., Oxon.) in 1955 and D.M. degree in 1963 at Oxford University, where he served on the Psychology Faculty from 1964, before relocating to the United States in 1967. He held Professorships in both neurology and psychology at Duke University and the University of Toronto, and he headed the Behavioral Neurology Research Division at the Shriver Center in Boston, Massachusetts. He also served as Presidents of the International Neuropsychological Society and the Society for Philosophy and Psychology.

Kinsbourne died in Winchester, Massachusetts on 21 April 2024, at the age of 92.

== Work ==
Kinsbourne was the first to identify and systematically describe the infant disorder "opsoclonus myoclonus" syndrome, sometimes called Kinsbourne syndrome in his honor. He also was first to describe "hiatus hernia" with contortions of the neck, subsequently called Sandifer Syndrome in honor of his mentor, Dr. Paul Sandifer.

Kinsbourne published over 400 articles, including: The Corpus Callosum as a Component of a Circuit for Selection, How the Senses Combine in the Brain, and Disorders of Mental Development.[6]

Kinsbourne also published an article titled The Immune System’s Moderating Response to Inflammation Relieves Autistic Behavior: Response to Peter Good. He noticed that each autistic movement is caused by pathologically heightened arousal. He concluded that autistic behaviors can be improved with a fever. If this is true then a remedy for autism maybe a simple stimulation of the vagus nerve.[7]

At the same time Kinsbourne wrote two articles which were published in 1993, one being Unity and Diversity in the Human Brain: Evidence from Injury [8] where he talks about cognitive neuropsychology, and the other article Awareness of Deficit After Brain Injury: Clinical and Theoretical Issues [9] where he talks about the systematic review he performs for certain types of disorders. Kinsbourne was the co-chair of the Department of Psychology at The New School. Kinsbourne has published around 400 articles in multiple areas of cognitive neuroscience, including brain-behavior relations, contralateral brain organization, consciousness, imitation, laterality among normal and abnormal populations, memory and amnestic disorders, unilateral neglect, attention and Attention Deficit Disorder, autism, learning disabilities, intellectual disability, and dyslexia.

Later publications include:

Somatic Twist: A Model for the Evolution of Decussation (2013); Imitation and Entrainment: Brain Mechanisms and Social Consequences (2004); The Corpus Callosum as a Component of a Circuit for Selection (2003); How the Senses Combine in the Brain (2003); The Brain and Body Awareness (2002); Adult ADHD: Controlled Medical Assessment (2001); Dynamic Self-Organization of the Cerebral Network (2001); Disorders of Mental Development (2000); Unity and Diversity in the Human Brain: Evidence from Injury (1998); Time and the Observer: The Where and When of Consciousness in the Brain (1992).[10]

== See also ==
- Functional cerebral distance, a principle developed by Kinsbourne
