= Autism's False Prophets =

2008 book by vaccine expert Paul Offit on origins of antivaccine movement

- Front cover of first edition
- Author: Paul Offit
- Language: English
- Subject: Autism and vaccine controversy
- Publisher: Columbia University Press
- Publication date: September 5, 2008; 18 years ago
- Publication place: United States
- Media type: Print (Hardcover)
- Pages: 328 (first edition)
- ISBN: 978-0-231-14636-4
- OCLC: 221961980
- Dewey Decimal: 618.92/85882 22
- LC Class: RJ506.A9 O34 2008

Autism's False Prophets: Bad Science, Risky Medicine, and the Search for a Cure is a 2008 book by Paul Offit, a vaccine expert and chief of infectious diseases at Children's Hospital of Philadelphia. The book focuses on the controversy surrounding the now-discredited link between vaccines and autism. The scientific consensus is that no convincing scientific evidence supports these claims, and a 2011 pharmacotherapy journal article described the vaccine-autism connection as "the most damaging medical hoax of the last 100 years".

== Summary ==
Offit describes the origins and development of claims regarding the MMR vaccine and the vaccine preservative thiomersal, as well as subsequent scientific evidence which has disproved a link with autism. The book discusses possible explanations for the persistence of these claims in the face of scientific evidence to the contrary, as well as the proliferation of potentially risky and unproven treatments for autism. The author takes a critical view of several advocates of a vaccine–autism link, including Andrew Wakefield, David Kirby, Mark Geier, and Boyd Haley, raising scientific and, in some cases, ethical and legal concerns. The book also explores divisions within the autism community on the topic of vaccines, as some parents consider the ongoing narrow focus on vaccines a distraction from more scientifically promising avenues of research. In this vein, Offit interviews Kathleen Seidel, a mother of an autistic child who has published investigations critical of those who profit from promoting vaccine–autism claims.

Offit also touches on the heated and bitter debate surrounding vaccine claims. He describes receiving death threats, hate mail, and threats against his children as a result of his advocacy for vaccination. Offit declined to do a book tour for Autism's False Prophets, citing concerns about his physical safety and comparing the intensity of hatred and threats directed at him to that experienced by abortion providers. Author's royalties from the book are being donated to the Center for Autism Research at Children's Hospital of Philadelphia.

== Reception ==
The book was the nucleus of profiles of Offit in Newsweek and The Philadelphia Inquirer. The New York Post reviewed the book positively, concluding: "Although arguably the most courageous and most knowledgeable scientist about vaccines in the United States, Offit lives in fear for his life and that of his family." The Wall Street Journal also praised the book as "an invaluable chronicle that relates some of the many ways in which the vulnerabilities of anxious parents have been exploited."

The Philadelphia Inquirer wrote that the book "names names and calls nonsense nonsense", and provides "important insight into the fatal flaws of the key arguments of vaccine alarmists." The Inquirer applauded Offit's focus on slanted and sensationalist media coverage of the vaccine–autism issue, but faulted Offit for not holding scientists themselves sufficiently accountable for their failure to communicate the facts to the public.

The Rocky Mountain News noted that the book "turned the tables" on those who see a pharmaceutical-industry conspiracy behind vaccination, by pointing out that the advocates of the autism–vaccine link receive large sums of money from lawyers and lobbyists. The News applauded the book's deconstruction of "misinformation" from Don Imus, Jenny McCarthy, Joseph Lieberman, and Robert F. Kennedy, Jr., among others, but found Offit's "sarcasm and brow-beating of those he disagrees with" to be "grating".

Salon reviewed the book as an "enlightening, highly readable, and ... timely" work which "deconstruct[s] the anti-vaccine movement as one driven by bad science, litigious greed, hype and ego." Salon faulted Offit for minimizing the work that autism advocacy groups have done to raise awareness, create support networks, and obtain research funding; the review noted that Offit focuses instead on aggressive and scientifically "slanted" groups like Defeat Autism Now! and Generation Rescue. The review concluded that the book "effectively pulls back the curtain on the anti-vaccine movement to reveal a crusade grounded less in fact and more in greed and opportunism".

Science called the book "forceful" and "an easy-to-read medical thriller about the consequences of greed, hubris, and intellectual sloppiness." The review noted that Offit did not discuss the irrationality of human decision-making in the presence of relative risk and both anecdotal and empirical evidence, and mentioned that Offit did not carefully discuss the role of regression. In conclusion, the review observed that the book has emboldened the media to apply scientific principles, and called for using the book's momentum to shift resources from the autism–vaccination debate to research into causes and treatments.

The Journal of Autism and Developmental Disorders said the book "makes an important contribution to popular debates about the etiology and treatment of autism spectrum disorders. The book is arguably the most detailed and thorough history available of the current anti-vaccine movement". The review noted one possible weakness: the book gives light coverage to the public's fundamental misunderstanding of the epidemiology of autism, in that the public fears an "autism epidemic" that may not in fact be occurring. The review concluded with a call to scientists and physicians to follow Offit's lead in communicating to the public even uncomfortable truths about autism.

Four months after its release, The New York Times reported that the book had been endorsed widely by pediatricians, autism researchers, vaccine companies, and medical journalists, and was "galvanizing a backlash against the antivaccine movement in the United States." Many doctors are critical of "false equivalence" in media coverage of the vaccine issue, and now argue that reporters should treat the antivaccine lobby with the same level of indifference as AIDS denialism and other fringe theories.

Later in 2009, the New England Journal of Medicine reported that the book effectively advocated for vaccines and refuted the vaccine–autism myth. It noted that a particular strength of the book is its outline of the scientific method and the basic principles of probability and causality, and its coverage of the difficulty of explaining science to the public, such as the difference between causality and coincidence. It noted as a weakness the book's several diversions into topics such as breast implants.

Other largely favorable reviews appeared in BioScience, in Health Affairs, in the Journal of Child Neurology, and in the Journal of Clinical Investigation.

In a guest column for The Atlanta Journal-Constitution, neurologist Jon Poling panned Offit's book as "a novel of perceived good and evil". Poling, whose daughter was federally compensated for vaccine injuries, criticized Offit for attacking those with whom he disagrees: "In the story, Offit takes no prisoners, smearing characters in the vaccine-autism controversy as effortlessly as a rich cream cheese."

== See also ==
- MMR vaccine and autism
- Thiomersal and vaccines
- Folk epidemiology of autism
