= Arapahoe Community College =

Community college in Littleton, Colorado, US

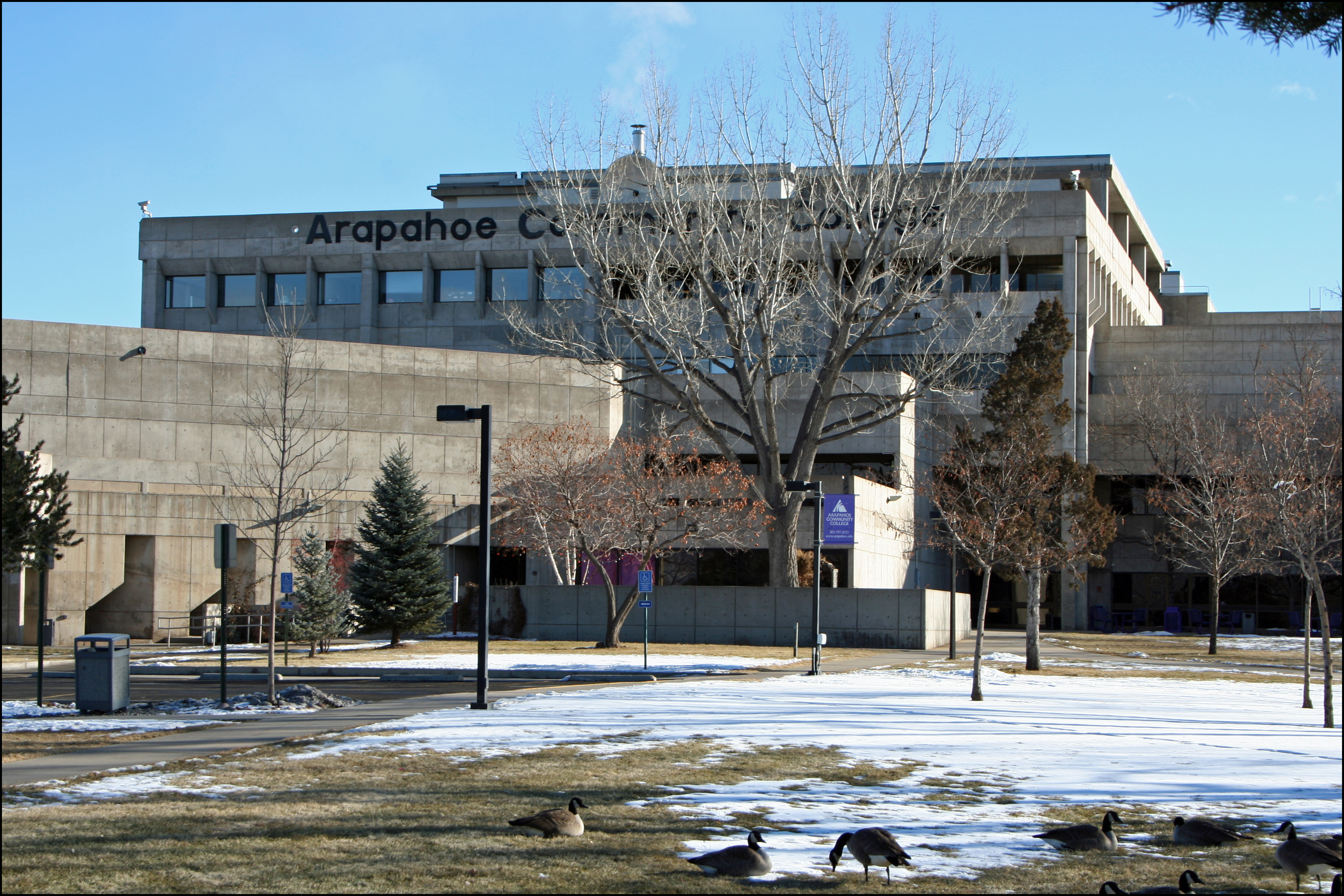
- Type: Public community college
- Established: 1965; 61 years ago
- President: Stephanie J. Fujii
- Students: 20,000 (annually)
- Location: Littleton, Colorado, United States; 39.6084°N 105.0196°W
- Campus: Urban / rural
- Colors: Purple and White
- Mascot: Pumas
- Website: www.arapahoe.edu

Arapahoe Community College (ACC) is a public community college in Littleton, Colorado. It was founded in 1965 as the first community college in the Denver area.

== History ==
The college began after a grass-roots movement by Littleton residents, led by Littleton activist Virginia Baker, to provide post-high school education in the area. Arapahoe Junior College began with 550 students.

In 2001, a new campus building in Parker was constructed next to Chaparral High School and opened as the University Center of Chaparral which worked with Arapahoe Community College, the University of Colorado at Denver, and the Douglas County School District. In 2010, it became a part of ACC and was renamed the Arapahoe Community College Parker Campus.

After some years of independent operation, ACC joined the Colorado Community College System, comprising 13 institutions.

In January 2017, the college announced plans to construct a $40 million campus in the Meadows community of Castle Rock, Colorado. The campus was planned to be a collaborative project between ACC, Colorado State University, and Douglas County School District. Construction on the campus broke ground on May 21, 2018, and opened August 16, 2019.

== Academics ==
ACC enrolls over 21,000 credit and non-credit students yearly across its three campuses in the southern portion of the Greater Denver Metropolitan area. The college has three campuses in the south Denver area, in Littleton, Parker, and Castle Rock.

The college offers over 90 degree and certificate programs. In addition to its traditional classroom learning environment, ACC has over 200 courses available online.

== Grants and endowments ==
ACC is one of six community colleges with a Great Books Program approved by the National Endowment for the Humanities and the Fund for the Improvement of Postsecondary Education. Participants in the program receive a certificate that is recognized by admission councils at many 4-year colleges and universities.

In June 2015, ACC earned a $2.3 million workforce training grant to support its Health Information Technology program (HIT), one of 71 such grants distributed nationwide.

== Other campuses ==
- Parker Campus, opened in 2001, 15653 Brookstone Drive, Parker, Colorado
- Castle Rock sturm collaboration campus, opened in 2019, 4500 Limelight Avenue, Castle Rock, Colorado

== Notable people ==
=== Notable faculty ===
- E. Allison Hagood, Professor of Psychology, co-author of Your Baby's Best Shot: Why Vaccines are Safe and Save Lives (2012)
