= Kathleen Seidel =

American blogger

Kathleen Seidel is an American researcher and weblog publisher from Peterborough, New Hampshire, best known for investigations and writing on autism. Her inquiries into the work and conduct of Mark Geier and his son David Geier regarding chelation therapy and a hormone-altering drug called Lupron, led to medical board actions in multiple states that suspended Mark Geier from medical practice, and caused David Geier to be arraigned for allegedly practising medicine without a license.

== Early life ==
The oldest of seven children, Seidel grew up in Anaheim, California, the daughter of a chemical engineer father and a mother who taught severely disabled children. She attended the University of California, Santa Cruz, where she majored in English and Russian literature and book arts, and then attended Columbia University to receive a masters' degree in library science.

== Pre-blogging career ==
Seidel then worked at a children's library in Asheville for three years before she returned to New York City, where she met Dave, whom she would later marry. She then worked for a few years at Orbis International and the Taconic Foundation before moving with her husband to New Hampshire in 1995 to raise their family. One of their children was diagnosed with autism in 2000.

== Blogging ==
She is known for running the website Neurodiversity.com, whose goal has been described as "honoring the variety of human wiring." She is known for correcting the misinsformation that vaccines cause autism. For instance, in 2007, with regard to claims of a mercury-autism link, she said, "Some people say, 'My child is a toxic waste dump,' People don't understand the stigma. I don't want someone looking at my family member that way." One of Seidel's most influential submissions was to the editors of the journal Autoimmunity Reviews, after the Geiers published a paper in that journal. She received no response, but the paper was subsequently retracted. She has been called "the Erin Brockovich of autism spectrum disorders", (specifically, by Irving Gottesman) and has been called "vicious" by the Geiers themselves. She and her husband, Dave, have two children, one of whom is on the autism spectrum. She has also criticized Boyd Haley for marketing OSR#1 as a dietary supplement (it has since been pulled from the shelves).

=== Subpoena ===
Seidel was the subject of a subpoena from Clifford Shoemaker, a vaccine-injury lawyer, requiring her to be deposed and to produce documents production in a case in which she was not involved, Sykes v. Bayer, and was defended by Public Citizen. The subpoena seems to have been motivated by a post on her blog, neurodiversity.com, about the lawsuit. As David Ardia at PBS's Idea Lab blog put it: "Seidel's post mainly focused on developments in the lawsuit, but some of her language was critical of the Sykes and their case. For example, she indicated that the Sykes have "aggressively promoted the overwhelmingly discredited scientific hypothesis that autism is a consequence of mercury poisoning" and called their lawsuit "a hydra-headed quest for revenge, for compensation, and for judicial validation of autism causation theories roundly rejected by the greater scientific community, by numerous courts, and by a great number of individuals and families whose interests they purport to represent."

One of the other criticisms revolved around her husband Dave Seidel, a Wikipedia editor, making edits to Geier's Wikipedia page and the pages of other autism-associated figures. David Gorski wrote on his blog, Respectful Insolence, "Reading the subpoena makes it mind-numbingly obvious that Shoemaker hopes to turn up evidence that Kathleen has accepted support from the federal government or vaccine manufacturers, which, I'm guessing, he hopes to use to slime her and destroy her credibility. There's nothing there, but Shoemaker thinks there is, and that's enough." Kathleen Seidel described the subpoena as "very broad" and filed a motion to quash. Shoemaker was sanctioned as a result. Her role in exposing the Geiers' quackery is explained by Seth Mnookin as follows: "The Geiers' use of Lupron on autistic children first received widespread attention in 2006, when Kathleen Seidel put together a blockbuster 16-part series on her website, neurodiversity.com." She is mentioned in an article in New York by Andrew Solomon, which also discusses the subpoena, which it says was served on March 26, 2008.

== Encryption survey ==
In 2016, along with Bruce Schneier and Saranya Vijayakumar, Seidel co-authored a survey regarding the effectiveness of restrictions on the exports of encryption products from the United States on their availability in other countries, as well as laws requiring encryption software to be made with a backdoor that the government can access. In their survey, the authors stated that such bans still leave those who want to keep the government from accessing their data through a backdoor with many foreign alternatives to American or British software.
