= Paul Offit =

American pediatric immunologist (born 1951)

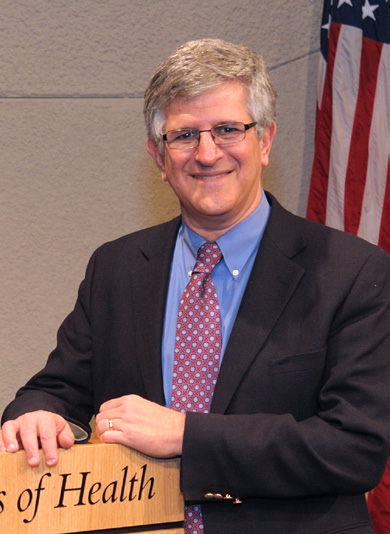
- Offit in 2011
- Born: Paul Allan Offit; March 27, 1951 (age 75); Baltimore, Maryland, U.S.
- Education: Tufts University (BA); University of Maryland, Baltimore (MD)
- Known for: Developing a rotavirus vaccine, public advocacy for vaccines
- Medical career
- Profession: Pediatrician and infectious disease doctor
- Institutions: Perelman School of Medicine at the University of Pennsylvania
- Sub-specialties: Vaccinology
- Awards: Maxwell Finland Award (2013); Albert B. Sabin Gold Medal (2018)
- Paul Offit's voice recorded October 2016
- Website: www.paul-offit.com

Paul Allan Offit (born March 27, 1951) is an American pediatrician specializing in infectious diseases, vaccines, immunology, and virology. He is the co-inventor of a rotavirus vaccine. Offit is the Maurice R. Hilleman Professor of Vaccinology, professor of pediatrics at the Perelman School of Medicine at the University of Pennsylvania, former chief of the Division of Infectious Diseases (1992–2014), and the director of the Vaccine Education Center at the Children's Hospital of Philadelphia.

Offit was a member of the Food and Drug Administration (FDA) Vaccines and Related Biological Products Advisory Committee from 2017 until September 2025, a board member of Every Child By Two; a founding board member of the Autism Science Foundation (ASF); and a former member of the Centers for Disease Control (CDC) Advisory Committee on Immunization Practices.

Offit has published more than 130 papers in medical and scientific journals in the areas of rotavirus-specific immune responses and vaccine safety, and is the author or co-author of books on vaccines, vaccination, the rejection of medicine by some religious groups, and antibiotics. He is one of the most public faces of the scientific consensus that vaccines have no association with autism. As a result, he has been the frequent target of hate mail and death threats.

In 2023, he was elected to the American Philosophical Society.

== Life ==
Offit grew up in Baltimore, the son of a shirtmaker. He went to his father's sales meetings and reacted negatively to the tall tales told by salespeople, instead preferring the clean and straightforward practice of science. When he was five years old, he was sent to a polio ward to recover from clubfoot surgery; this experience caused him to see children as vulnerable and helpless, and motivated him through the 25 years of the development of the rotavirus vaccine.

Offit decided to become a doctor, the first in his family. Offit earned his bachelor's degree from Tufts University and his M.D. from the University of Maryland School of Medicine. In 1980, he completed his residency training in Pediatrics at Children's Hospital of Pittsburgh. That year, he began a fellowship in infectious diseases at Children's Hospital of Philadelphia. One of his mentors was Maurice Hilleman, who developed many of the major vaccines in use today.

In 1990, Offit married Bonnie Fass-Offit, who is also a pediatrician. They had two children.

By 2008 Offit had become a leading advocate of childhood immunizations. He was opposed by vaccine critics, many of whom believe vaccines cause autism, a belief that has been rejected by major medical journals and professional societies. He received a death threat and received protection by an armed guard during meetings at the CDC. His 2008 book Autism's False Prophets catalyzed a backlash against the antivaccine movement in the U.S. He donated the royalties from the book to the Center for Autism Research at Children's Hospital of Philadelphia. Offit served on the board of the American Council on Science and Health until 2015 when he resigned from the group, accusing them of crossing the line for their promotion of e-cigarettes. In 2015, Offit appeared in a vaccine awareness video created by Robert Till in which he advocated teenage vaccinations.

== Rotavirus vaccine ==
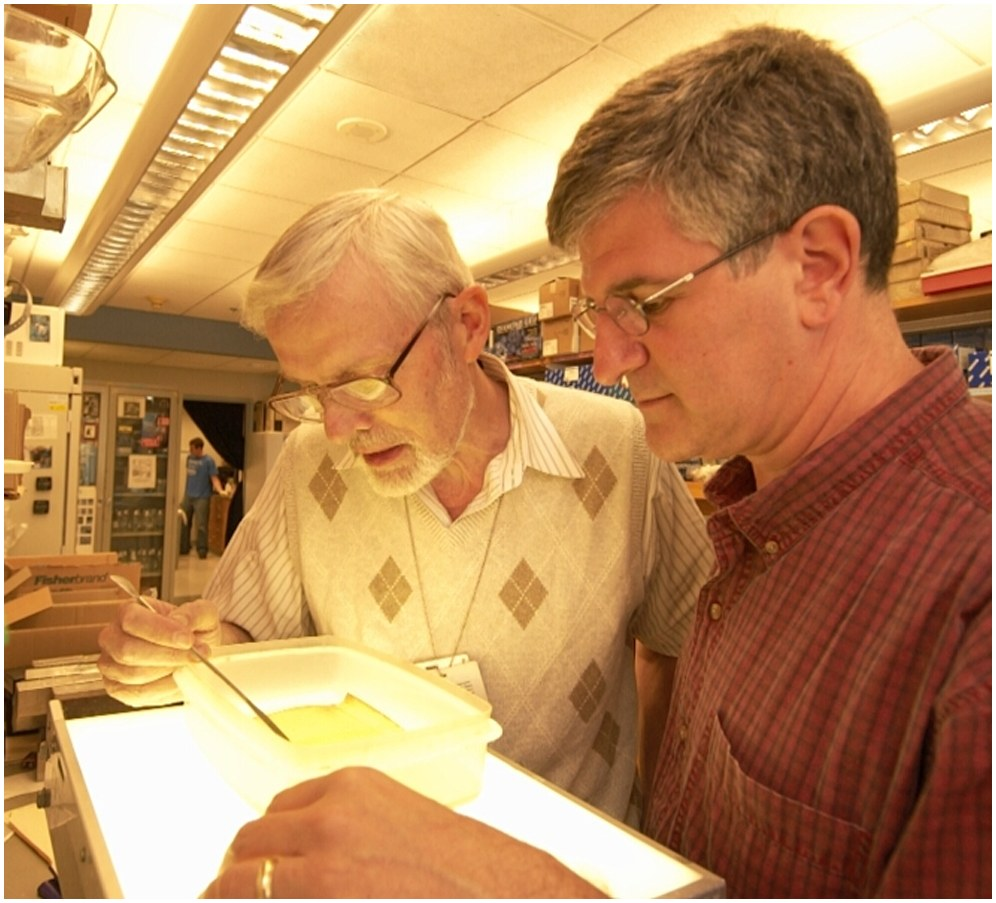
Paul Offit (right) along with H. Fred Clark. Clark and Offit are two of the three inventors of the rotavirus vaccine RotaTeq, which is credited with saving hundreds of lives each day.

Offit worked for 25 years on the development of a safe and effective vaccine against rotavirus, which is a cause of diarrhea, and which kills almost 600,000 children a year worldwide, about half as many as malaria kills; most deaths are outside the West. His interest in the disease stemmed from the death of a 9-month-old infant from rotavirus-caused dehydration while under his care as a pediatric resident in 1979.

Along with his colleagues Fred Clark and Stanley Plotkin, Offit invented RotaTeq, a pentavalent rotavirus vaccine manufactured by Merck & Co. Since 2006, RotaTeq has been one of two vaccines currently used against rotavirus.

In February 2006, RotaTeq was approved for inclusion in the recommended U.S. vaccination schedule, following its approval by the FDA. Premarketing studies found that RotaTeq was effective and safe, with an incidence of adverse events comparable to placebo. RotaTeq has been credited (by Peter Hotez) with saving hundreds of lives a day. Offit received an unspecified sum of money for his interest in RotaTeq. Offit was elected a fellow of the Committee for Skeptical Inquiry, in 2015.

== Smallpox vaccine ==
In 2002, during a period of fears about bioterrorism, Offit was the only member of the CDC's advisory panel to vote against a program to give smallpox vaccine to tens of thousands of Americans. He later argued on 60 Minutes II and The NewsHour with Jim Lehrer that the risk of harm for people getting the vaccine outweighed the risk of getting smallpox in the U.S. at the time.

== Action against dietary supplements and alternative medicine ==
In December 2013, Sarah Erush and Offit declared the Children's Hospital of Philadelphia has a moratorium on the use of dietary supplements without certain manufacturers' guarantee for quality.

Our hospital has acted to protect the safety of our patients. No longer will we administer dietary supplements unless the manufacturer provides a third-party written guarantee that the product is made under the F.D.A.’s “good manufacturing practice” (G.M.P.) conditions, as well as a Certificate of Analysis (C.O.A.) assuring that what is written on the label is what’s in the bottle.

Offit defines alternative medicine as quackery when it involves unappreciated harm and replacement of conventional therapies that work, with alternative therapies that do not. His books and articles warn against the expense and risk to health for recipients of alternative therapies. In 2013 he wrote the book Do you believe in Magic? – The Sense and Nonsense of Alternative Medicine. Offit states that the purpose of the book "is to take a critical look at the field of Alternative Medicine – to separate fact from myth" and that "There's only medicine that works and medicine that doesn't."(p. 6) One of Offit's concerns is the scare tactics he says proponents of alternative medicine will often use, in a 2010 podcast with the Point of Inquiry Offit stated "it is very difficult to unscare people when you scare them."

Offit has said that the Dietary Supplement Health and Education Act of 1994 should be overturned to provide proper oversight and action against supplement providers.

== Reception ==
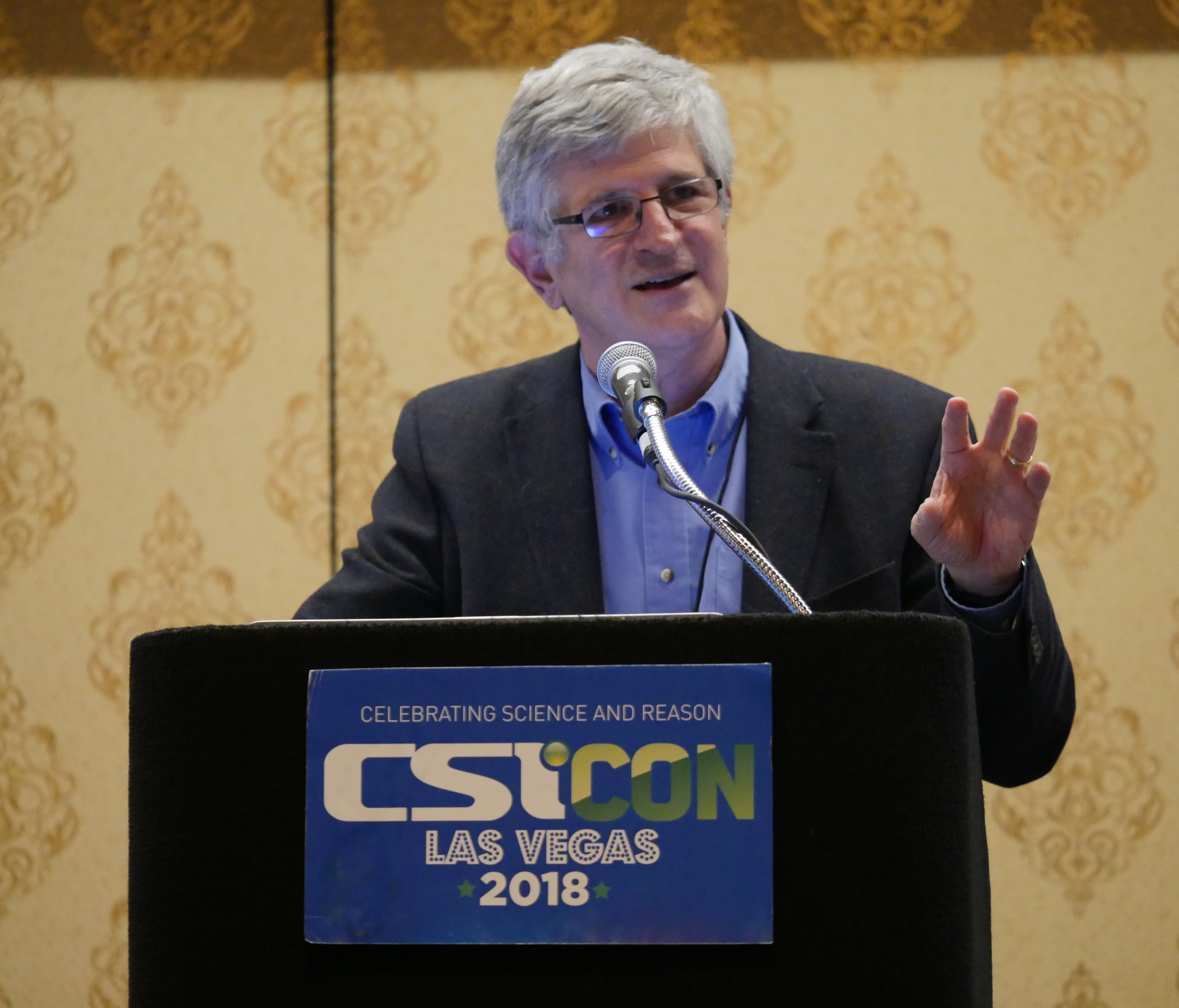
Offit at CSICon 2018

Offit is a recipient of numerous awards, including the J. Edmund Bradley Prize for Excellence in Pediatrics from the University of Maryland Medical School, the Young Investigator Award in Vaccine Development from the Infectious Diseases Society of America, the 2013 Maxwell Finland Award for Scientific Achievement and a Research Career Development Award from the National Institutes of Health. In 2018, Offit was awarded the Albert B. Sabin Gold Medal from the Sabin Vaccine Institute in Washington, DC for his work on the oral rotavirus vaccine and his leadership in promoting immunization.

In 2011 Offit was honored by the Biotechnology Industry Organization with the 2011 Biotech Humanitarian Award. Offit donated the award's $10,000 prize to the Vaccine Education Center at The Children's Hospital of Philadelphia. Also in 2011, Offit was elected to the Institute of Medicine at the group's annual meeting. In 2013 Offit was presented with the Robert B. Balles Prize in Critical Thinking by the Committee for Skeptical Inquiry (CSI) for Do You Believe in Magic? The Sense and Nonsense of Alternative Medicine. "Offit is a literal lifesaver... educates the public about the dangers of alternative medicine, may save many, many more."

Michael Specter wrote that Offit "has become a figure of hatred to the many vaccine denialists and conspiracy theorists." Specter reported that Offit had often been threatened with violence by anti-vaccine advocates, necessitating precautions such as screening Offit's packages for mail bombs and providing guards when Offit attends federal health advisory committee meetings. At a 2008 vaccine activism rally in Washington, D.C., environmental lawyer Robert F. Kennedy, Jr. criticized Offit's ties to drug companies, calling him a "poster child for the term 'biostitute'." Curt Linderman Sr., the editor of the Autism File blog, wrote online that it would "be nice" if Offit "was dead".

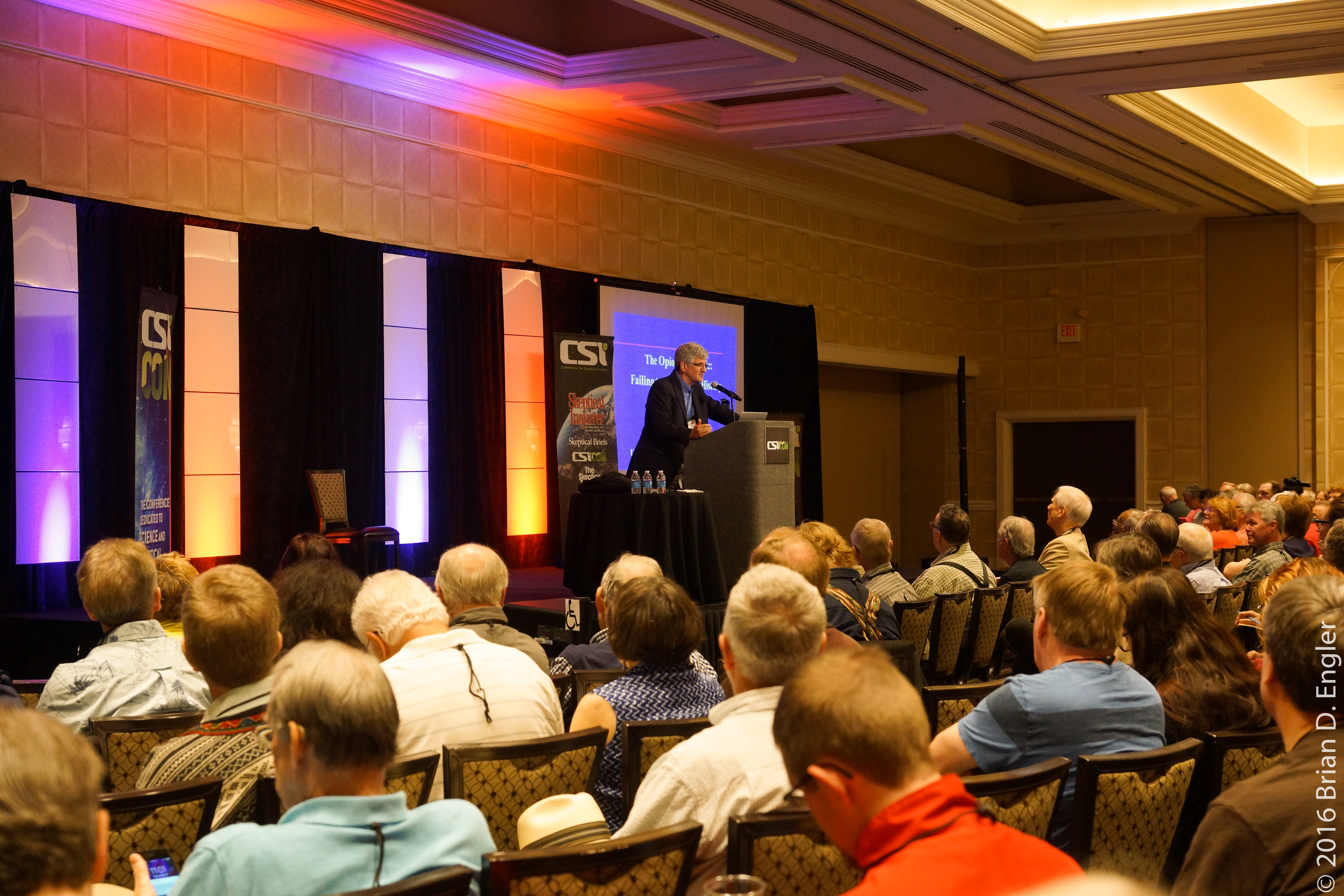
Offit lecture on opioids at CSICon 2016

Such criticism has provoked statements in Offit's defense. Peter Hotez, a professor and vaccine researcher at George Washington University, has been quoted in a Newsweek article:

Peter Hotez ... says government health officials should take a bolder stand in reassuring the public. Hotez feels as strongly as Offit does about the science (saying vaccines cause autism, he says, "is like saying the world is flat"), but, like other busy scientists, he's less willing to enter the fray. "Here's someone who has created an invention that saves hundreds of lives every day," says Hotez, whose daughter, 15, has autism, "and he's vilified as someone who hates children. It's just so unfair."

== Publications and media ==
Offit has written or co-written several books on vaccines, vaccination and the public, and antibiotics, as well as dozens of scholarly articles on the topic. Isabelle Rapin, a neurology professor at the Albert Einstein College of Medicine, wrote in Neurology Today about Autism's False Prophets:

This book explores why parents, seeking in vain for a cure and for an explanation of their child's problem, are so vulnerable to false hopes and to the nasty predators who have from time immemorial always taken advantage of the desperate in our society. ... [Offit] became outraged by Dr. Andrew Wakefield's 1998 study in the Lancet that blamed the measles-mumps-rubella (MMR) vaccine for causing autism. Dr. Offit predicted the paper would precipitate a resurgence of measles and its serious complications, and even deaths – a prophecy soon realized.

In "The Cutter Incident" (see Cutter Laboratories incident), Offit describes fallout relating to an early poliovirus vaccine tragedy that had the effect of deterring production of already licensed vaccines and discouraging the development of new ones. Offit advocates for the repeal of religious exemptions to vaccine requirements, saying that such exemptions amount to medical neglect.

He has also written books on the instances where science generated harmful ideas (Pandora's Lab) and the history of religious opposition (in some groups) to modern medicine (Bad Faith).

In 2021, Offit released You Bet Your Life, which is a history of medical innovations with a particular focus on how some degree of risk is always present in medical innovation.

In 2023, Offit started a newsletter called "Beyond the Noise". With This Week in Virology host Vincent Racaniello, he posts video versions of the newsletters on YouTube.

In 2024, Offit published his memoir of the COVID-19 pandemic and vaccine roll-out called Tell Me When It’s Over: An Insider’s Guide to Deciphering Covid Myths and Navigating Our Post-Pandemic World.

=== Books ===
External videos
- After Words interview with Offit on You Bet Your Life, November 14, 2021, C-SPAN

- Offit, Paul A.; Fass-Offit, Bonnie; Bell, Louis M. (1999). Breaking the Antibiotic Habit: A Parent's Guide to Coughs, Colds, Ear Infections, and Sore Throats. John Wiley. ISBN 978-0-471-31982-5.
- Offit, Paul A.; Bell, Louis M. (1999). Vaccines: What Every Parent Should Know. Macmillan. ISBN 978-0-02-863861-4.

- Offit, Paul A.; Bell, Louis M. (2003). Vaccines: What You Should Know (third ed.). Wiley. ISBN 978-0-471-42004-0.

- Marshall, Gary S; Dennehy, Penelope H.; Greenberg, David P.; Offit, Paul A.; Tan, Tina Q. (2003). The Vaccine Handbook: A Practical Guide for Clinicians. Lippincott Williams & Wilkins. ISBN 978-0-7817-3569-8.
- Offit, Paul A. (2005). The Cutter Incident: How America's First Polio Vaccine Led to the Growing Vaccine Crisis. Yale University Press. ISBN 978-0-300-10864-4.
- Offit, Paul A. (2007). Vaccinated: One Man's Quest to Defeat the World's Deadliest Diseases. Smithsonian Books/Collins. ISBN 978-0-06-122795-0.

- E-book version: Offit, Paul A. (2009). Vaccinated: Triumph, Controversy, and An Uncertain F. HarperCollins. ISBN 9780061871511.

- Offit, Paul A. (2008). Autism's False Prophets: Bad Science, Risky Medicine, and the Search for a Cure. Columbia University Press. ISBN 978-0-231-14636-4.
- Offit, Paul A. (2011). Deadly Choices: How the Anti-Vaccine Movement Threatens Us All. Basic Books. ISBN 978-0-465-02149-9.
- E. Allison Hagood; Stacy Mintzer Herlihy (2012). Your Baby's Best Shot: Why Vaccines Are Safe and Save Lives. Paul A. Offit (foreword). Lanham, Md: Rowman & Littlefield Publishers. ISBN 978-1-4422-1578-8.
- Plotkin, Stanley; Orenstein, Walter; Offit, Paul A. (2012). Vaccines (sixth ed.). Saunders. ISBN 9781455700905.
- Offit, Paul A. (2013). Do You Believe in Magic? The Sense and Nonsense of Alternative Medicine. Harper. ISBN 978-0062222961.

- UK title: Killing Us Softly: The Sense and Nonsense of Alternative Medicine

- Offit, Paul A. (2015). Bad Faith: When Religious Belief Undermines Modern Medicine. Basic Books. ISBN 978-0465082964.
- Offit, Paul A. (2017). Pandora's Lab: Seven Stories of Science Gone Wrong. National Geographic. ISBN 978-1426217982.
- Offit, Paul A. (2018). Bad Advice: or Why Celebrities, Politicians, and Activists Aren't Your Best Source of Health Information. Columbia University Press. ISBN 978-0231186988.
- Offit, Paul A. (2020). Overkill: When Modern Medicine Goes Too Far. Harper. ISBN 978-0062947499.
- Offit, Paul (2021). You Bet Your Life: From Blood Transfusions to Mass Vaccination, the Long and Risky History of Medical Innovation. Basic Books. ISBN 978-1541620391.
- Offit, Paul (2024). Tell Me When It's Over: An Insider's Guide to Deciphering Covid Myths and Navigating Our Post-Pandemic World. National Geographic Partners, LLC. ISBN 978-1-4262-2366-2.
