= Your Baby's Best Shot =

2012 book about childhood immunization by E. Allison Hagood and Stacy Mintzer Herlihy

Your Baby's Best Shot: Why Vaccines Are Safe and Save Lives
- First edition
- Authors: E. Allison Hagood; Stacy Mintzer Herlihy
- Language: English
- Subjects: Vaccines; Childhood immunization Vaccine hesitancy
- Genre: Nonfiction, medicine
- Published: August 9, 2012
- Publisher: Rowman & Littlefield
- Pages: 220
- ISBN: 144221578X
- OCLC: 783171538

Your Baby's Best Shot: Why Vaccines are Safe and Save Lives is a 2012 book that explains the history of and science behind vaccines. The book encourages routine childhood immunization and dispels myths regarding vaccine safety. It was published by Rowman and Littlefield and co-written by E. Allison Hagood (a psychology professor) and Stacy Mintzer Herlihy (a freelance writer). The foreword was written by pediatrician and vaccinologist Paul Offit.

== Summary ==
The book's introduction states: "I hope that anyone reading this book will read it and gain an understanding why vaccines are so vitally important to the health and well being of all of us." Chapter 1 describes who the authors are, their own experiences with vaccines, and what motivated them to write this book. Chapter 2 focuses on the story of Edward Jenner and the development of the first vaccine. Chapter 3 discusses the biological mechanisms by which vaccines work, as well as the concept of herd immunity. Chapter 4 debunks anti-vaccine activists' claims that certain vaccine ingredients, such as formaldehyde and polymyxin B, are unsafe.

== Reviews ==
Kristen Kemp of Parents called the book a "great resource", and Publishers Weekly wrote that it was "extensively researched and forceful." Another positive review came from Booklist, where Karen Springen wrote that "This thoroughly researched book should convince even ardent vaccine skeptics that the benefits of giving kids shots to prevent illnesses far outweigh any negatives," and David Gorski wrote that the book was "essential reading for all new parents with any doubts at all about vaccines."
