= BDTH2 =

BDTH_{2}
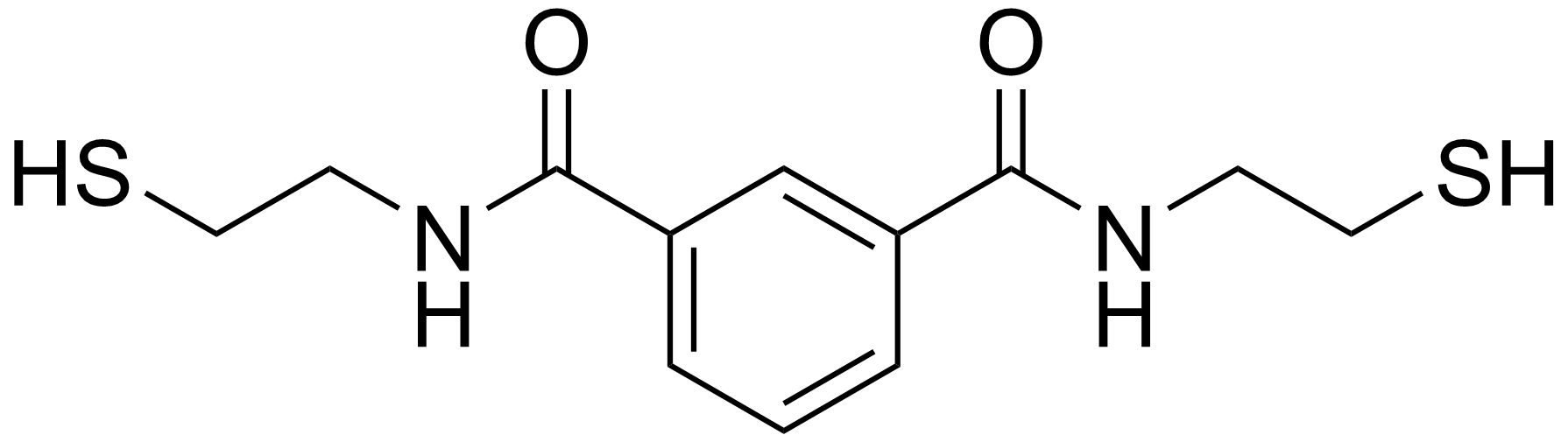

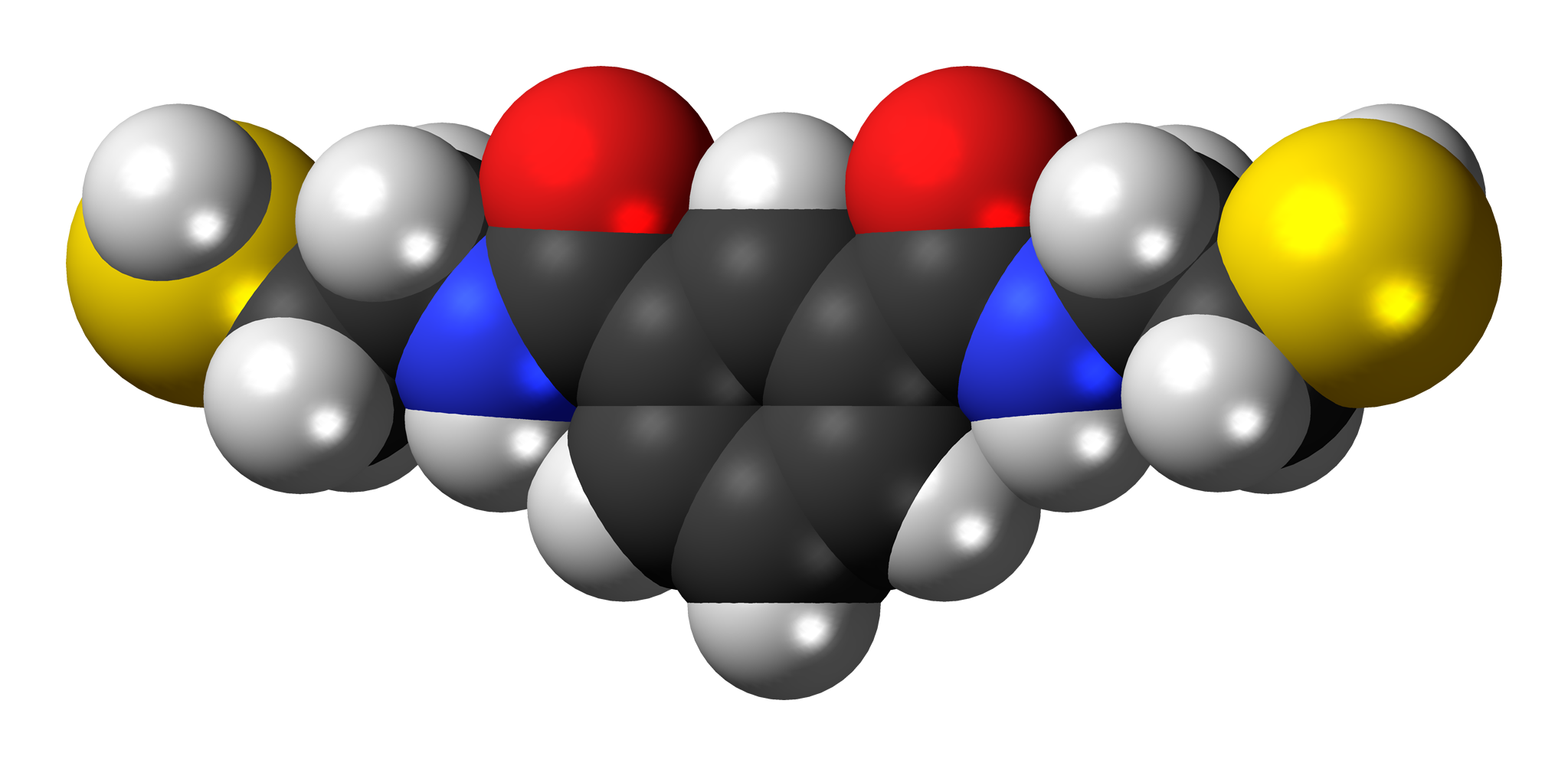

Names
- Preferred IUPAC name N^{1},N^{3}-Bis(2-sulfanylethyl)benzene-1,3-dicarboxamide
- Other names BDET; BDTH_{2}; BDETH_{2}; N,N′-Bis(2-mercaptoethyl)-1,3-benzenedicarboxamide; N1,N3-bis(2-mercaptoethyl)isophthalamide; NBMI;

Identifiers
CAS Number	351994-94-0
3D model (JSmol)	Interactive image; Interactive image
ChemSpider	19238563
MeSH	1,3-benzenediamidoethanethiol
PubChem CID	16043475
UNII	4U7K5X4ANS
CompTox Dashboard (EPA)	DTXSID10610932
- InChI: InChI=1S/C12H16N2O2S2/c15-11(13-4-6-17)9-2-1-3-10(8-9)12(16)14-5-7-18/h1-3,8,17-18H,4-7H2,(H,13,15)(H,14,16) Key: JUTBAVRYDAKVGQ-UHFFFAOYSA-N; InChI=1/C12H16N2O2S2/c15-11(13-4-6-17)9-2-1-3-10(8-9)12(16)14-5-7-18/h1-3,8,17-18H,4-7H2,(H,13,15)(H,14,16) Key: JUTBAVRYDAKVGQ-UHFFFAOYAW
- SMILES: O=C(NCCS)C1=CC(C(NCCS)=O)=CC=C1; O=C(NCCS)c1cccc(c1)C(=O)NCCS

Properties
Chemical formula	C_{12}H_{16}N_{2}O_{2}S_{2}
Molar mass	284.39 g·mol^{−1}
Density	1.23 g/mL
Melting point	132 to 135 °C (270 to 275 °F; 405 to 408 K)
- Except where otherwise noted, data are given for materials in their standard state (at 25 °C [77 °F], 100 kPa). verify (what is ?) Infobox references

BDTH_{2} (also called BDET and BDETH_{2}; trade names B9, MetX, and OSR#1) is an organosulfur compound that is used as a chelation agent. It is a colourless solid. The molecule consists of two thiol groups and linked via a pair of amide groups.

== Preparation ==
The compound was reported in about 1994 after a search for chelating agents selective for mercury. It was licensed in 2006 to CTI Science with the long-term goal of using BDTH_{2} to treat mercury poisoning. This compound is prepared by treating isophthaloyl dichloride with two equiv of cysteamine:

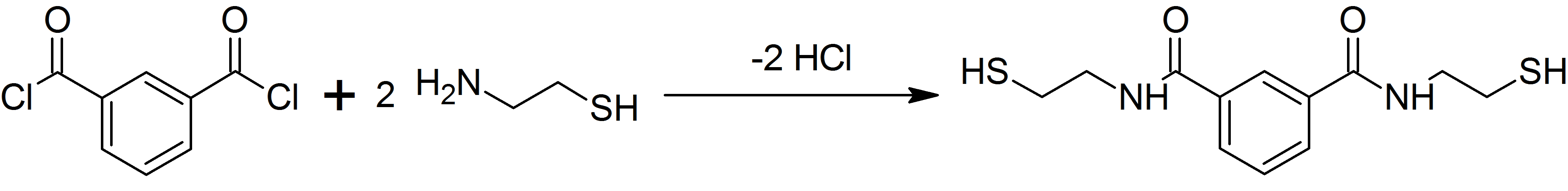

== Use ==
=== Environmental remediation ===
BDTH_{2} can be used to chelate heavy metals like lead, cadmium, copper, manganese, zinc, iron, and mercury from ground water, coal tailings, gold ore, waste water of battery-recycling plants, and contaminated soil.

BDTH_{2} appears to bind mercury more strongly than do other chelators. The mercury-BDT complex does not break down even at high pH and in the presence of cyanides, as in waste water of gold mines. The particular stability of the mercury bond can be attributed to the linear position of the two thiols. The company Covalent Research Technologies had investigated BDTH_{2} for the removal of mercury from flue gas without success.

=== Clinical use ===
Animal experiments with inorganic mercury showed, that BDTH_{2} effectively binds mercury in the body, and the resulting mercury derivative is excreted in the feces. Experimental animals showed no signs of poisoning. It is unclear, how the BDTH_{2}-mercury-chelate behaves in the long term. BDTH_{2} is lipophilic, as opposed to DMPS and DMSA; this enables it to cross lipid membranes, including the blood-brain-barrier, and enter bone marrow. In animal experiments, mercury in brain tissue neither increased nor decreased. There are indications that the BDTH_{2}-mercury-compound moves into adipose tissue. It is unknown how BDTH_{2} works with methyl-mercury.

BDTH_{2} appears to bind copper and zinc in vivo weakly. In contrast, DMPS und DMSA bind these ions more strongly. Its affinity is low for other "hard" ions, e.g., Ca^{2+}, Mg^{2+}, Na^{+}, and K^{+}.

Until July 2010, CTI Science sold BDTH_{2} as a nutritional supplement under the name OSR#1. Since OSR#1 didn't fulfill criteria of a nutritional supplement, its sale was stopped under pressure of the U.S. Food and Drug Administration. In January 2012, BDTH_{2} was designated by the European Commission as an orphan drug, which guarantees CTI Science ten years of exclusive marketing rights. In April 2012, the FDA designated the compound as an orphan drug.

== Potential applications ==
Like most thiols, BDTH_{2} binds to mercury salts to form thiolate complexes. In principle, it could be used to remove mercury from water for industrial applications under a wide range of conditions, including the high pH and cyanide of the effluent from gold mining. In industrial use, BDTH_{2} is easy to make and can be used either as-is or in the form of sodium or potassium salts that are more soluble in water.

BDTH_{2} binds to mercury with a strong, nonpolar covalent bond within a water-insoluble organic framework. The resulting BDT–Hg precipitate is stable, and leaches mercury only under highly acidic or basic conditions. BDTH_{2} also binds to other elements, including arsenic, cadmium, copper, lead, and selenium. It is effective and economical for removing small traces of mercury from polluted soil, as the precipitate is inert and can be left in the soil after treatment.

== Dietary supplement and controversy ==
BDTH_{2} had been marketed under the name OSR#1 as a dietary supplement for treatment of autism. The U.S. Food and Drug Administration determined that BDTH_{2} is a drug rather than a supplement and issued a warning, resulting in its removal from the market. The main proponent of the compound, Dr. Boyd Haley, was chairman of the department of chemistry where research is also conducted on the utility of this compound for remediation of heavy metal pollution.

== See also ==
- Chelation therapy
