= Childhood immunizations in the United States =

Vaccines provide immunity to children before exposure to potentially serious infectious diseases, and play a central role in preventing the spread of diseases with epidemic potential. The schedule for childhood immunizations in the United States (US) is published and routinely updated by the Centers for Disease Control and Prevention (CDC). The childhood vaccine schedule is designed specifically to deliver protection during periods of greatest vulnerability. The schedule includes vaccines of several different types against viral and bacterial infections including hepatitis B, rotavirus, diphtheria, tetanus, pertussis, Haemophilus influenzae type b, pneumococcal disease, polio, influenza, varicella, hepatitis A, measles, mumps, rubella, meningococcal disease, and human papillomavirus. Childhood immunization in the US has been affected by recurring vaccine hesitancy and anti-vaccine activism, including concerns about vaccine safety, vaccine ingredients, and the number and timing of recommended vaccines. Routine childhood vaccination in the US was disrupted during the COVID-19 pandemic, but immunization rates returned to near pre-pandemic levels by 2024. Common adverse reactions to vaccines are usually mild and self-limited, while serious adverse events caused by vaccination are rare. Immunization guidance also identifies precautions and contraindications for children in whom specific vaccines should be delayed or avoided. Among children born in the US between 1994 and 2023, it is estimated that routine childhood vaccinations prevented approximately 508 million illnesses, 32 million hospitalizations, and over 1 million deaths.

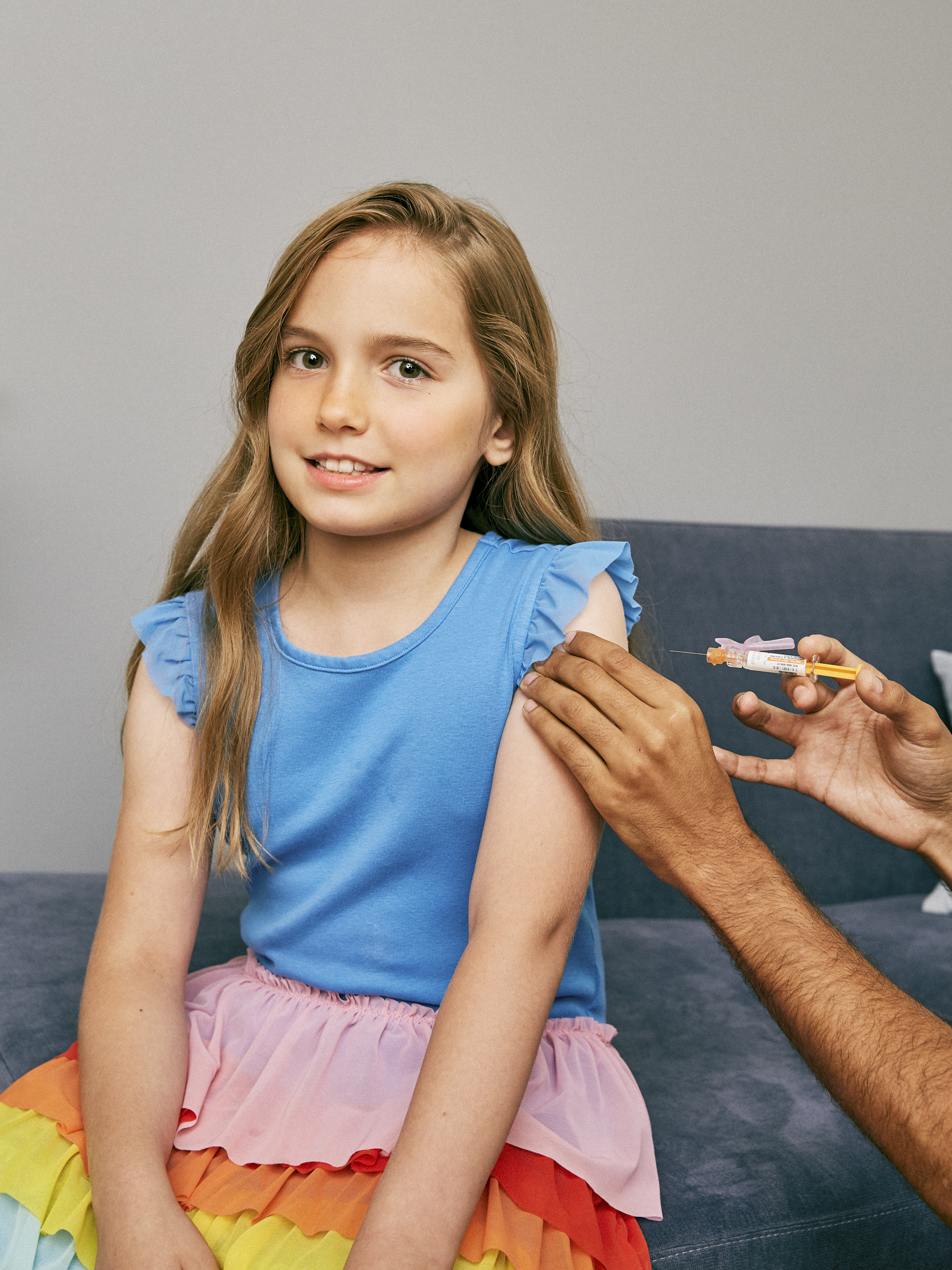
Girl about to receive a vaccine in her upper arm

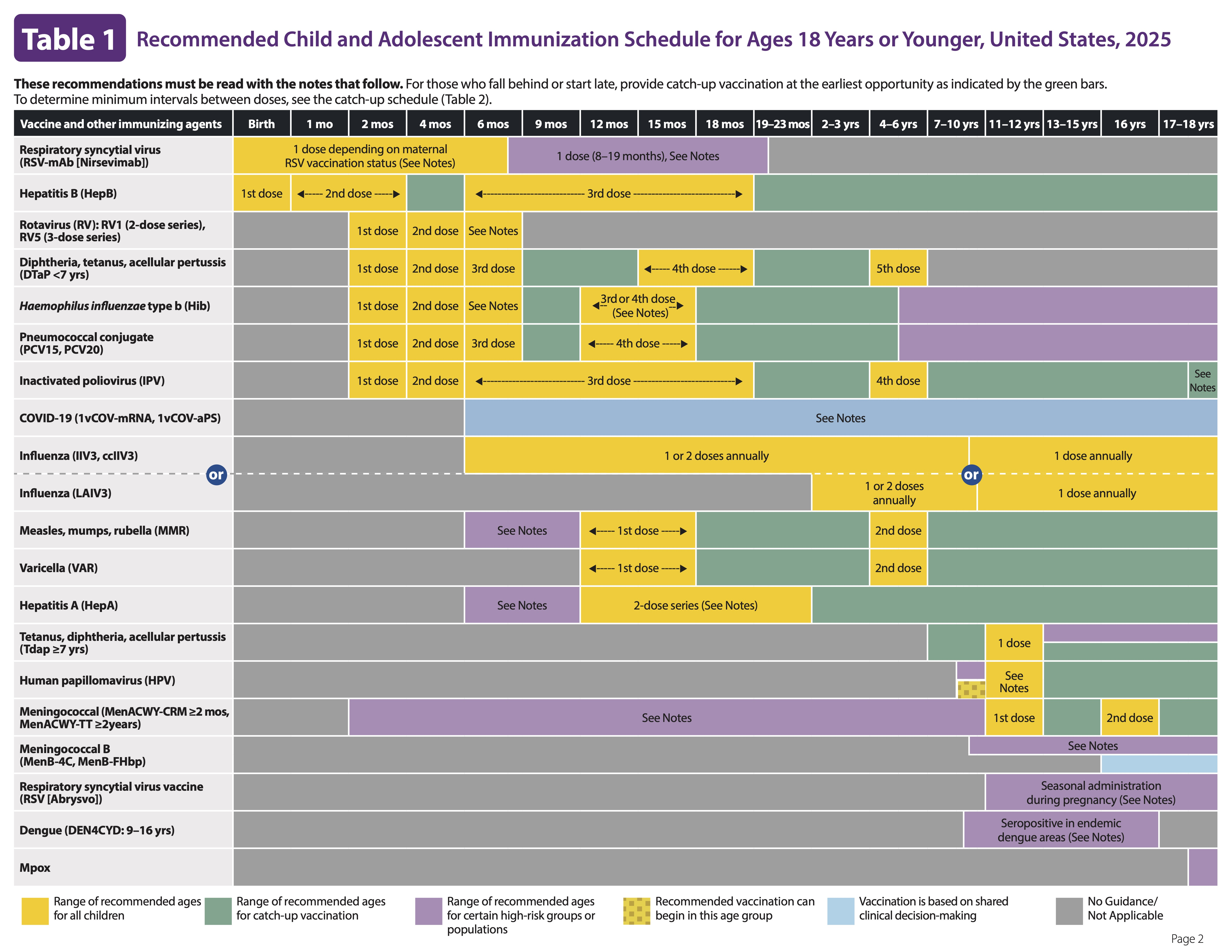
2025 childhood immunization schedule in the US

== Risks and safety monitoring ==
As with all medications, vaccines can cause side effects. The side effects of vaccination are typically minor and go away within a few days. There is a risk that the child could have a severe reaction, but these reactions are rare. However, a decision not to immunize a child also involves risk and could put the child and others who come into contact with him or her at risk of contracting that disease. Many adverse events reported after vaccination are coincidental events that occur after vaccination but are not caused by the vaccine; the timing of an adverse event alone does not establish that vaccination caused the symptoms.

In the US, vaccine safety is monitored through passive reporting systems, linked health databases, and clinical research networks. The National Childhood Vaccine Injury Act of 1986 requires health care providers and vaccine manufacturers to report specified adverse events to the Vaccine Adverse Event Reporting System (VAERS); providers are encouraged to report all clinically important adverse events, even when causality is uncertain. VAERS is used to detect possible safety signals for further investigation, but it is not designed to determine whether a vaccine caused a reported event. Potential safety concerns can be evaluated through other systems, including the CDC's Vaccine Safety Datalink, which uses large linked databases for epidemiologic studies, and Clinical Immunization Safety Assessment Project, which conducts clinical research related to vaccine safety.

== Benefits ==
Following the introduction of routine childhood vaccination in the US, reported cases of most vaccine-preventable diseases declined by more than 90%. The CDC estimates that among approximately 117 million children born in the US between 1994 and 2023, routine childhood immunization prevented about 508 million cases of disease, 32 million hospitalizations, and more than 1.1 million premature deaths from vaccine-preventable illnesses, with the number of illnesses averted ranging from roughly 5,000 cases of tetanus to nearly 100 million cases of measles and varicella. The same CDC report estimated "direct savings of $540 billion and societal savings of $2.7 trillion" from these prevented illnesses.

== Vaccine compositions ==
Vaccine Examples	Component	Dose (Units) (see key)	Dose (μg)	References
HepB	Hepatis virus B		20	
Rotarix	Rotavirus	1M CCID50		
DTaP	Diphtheria toxoid	6.7-25 Lf		
DTaP	Tetanus toxoid	5 – 7.5 Lf		
DTaP	aP toxoid		3.2 to 40	
DTaP	aP filamentous agglutinin		2.5 to 34.4	
DTaP	aP Pertactin		1.6 to 23.4	
DTaP	aP fimbriae 2		0.8 to 5	
DTaP	aP fimbriae 3		5	
Haemophilus influenzae type B	Hib polysaccharide		10	
Streptococcus pneumoniae	13 polysaccharide serotypes (each)		2.2	
Polio	D antigen 3 types (each)	8-40 Units		
Influenza	Quadrivalent (each)		15	
Chickenpox	varicella-zoster glycoprotein E		50	
HepA	Hepatis virus A	720 EL.U		
MMR	Measles	20000 Inf.U		
MMR	Mumps	40000 Inf.U		
MMR	Rubella	8000 Inf.U		
Meningococcal ACWY	A,C,W,Y polysaccharides (each)		4	
Meningococcal B	NadA, NHBA, fHbp (each)		50	
Meningococcal B	Outer Membrane Vesicles		25	
Human papillomavirus	HPV L1 protein 9 types (each)		20 to 60	

Key

- CCID50= cell culture infective dose at 50%
- IU= international units
- Lf= Limits of Flocculation (1:1 toxin:antitoxin)
- Inf.U= Infectious units

== Hepatitis B ==
Hepatitis B is a contagious virus that affects the liver, infection can last from a few weeks to a serious lifelong illness. Two different types of infection exist for this disease, "acute" and "chronic". Acute Hepatitis B is a short-term illness that occurs within 6 months of exposure, Chronic Hepatitis B is long term and happens when the virus remains in the body. The younger the child is, the greater their chance of developing a chronic infection and this risk goes down as the child gets older. Approximately 90% of infected infants will develop a chronic infection.

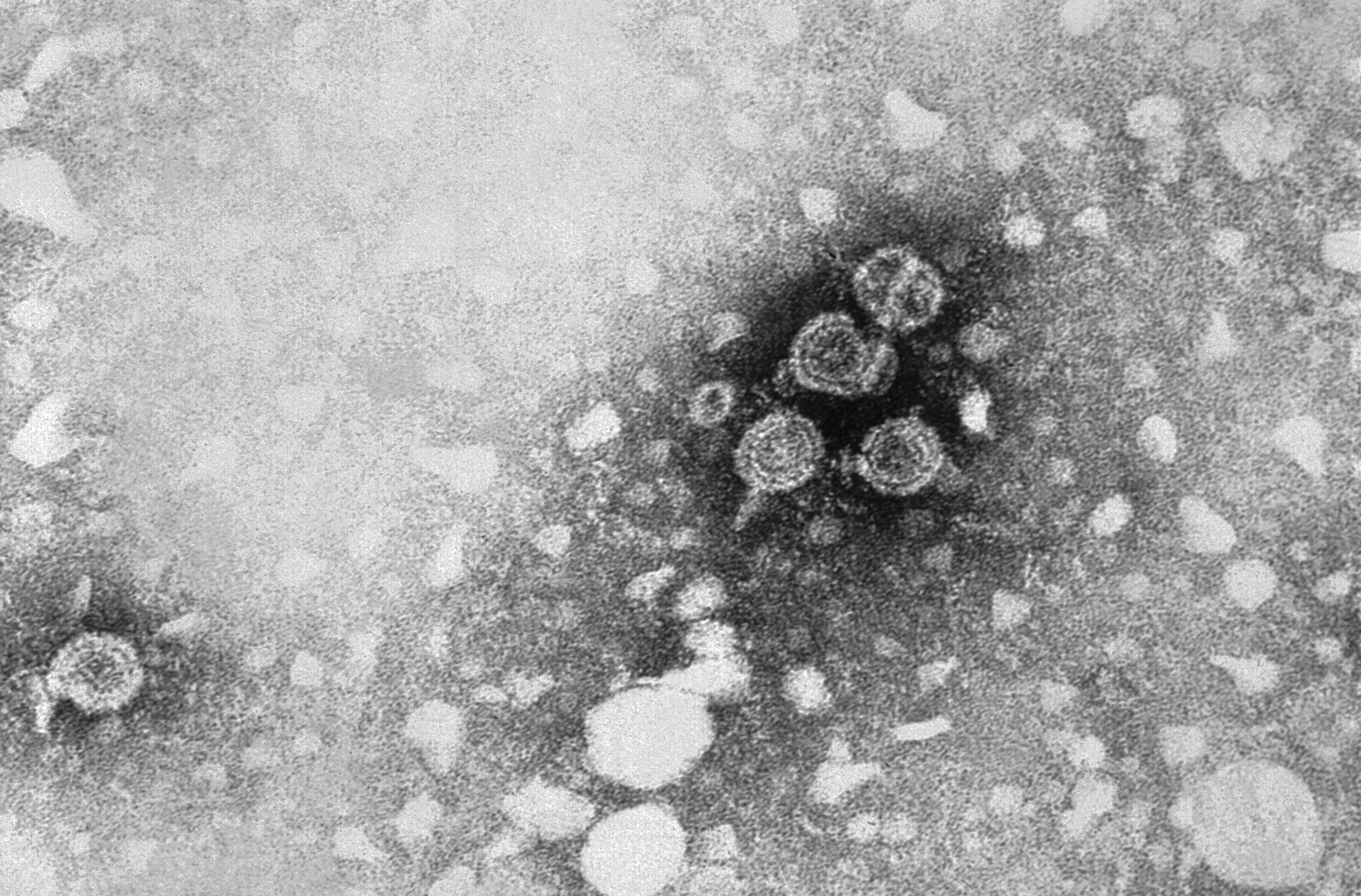
Hepatitis B virus 01

=== Vaccine ===
Since 1990, when the vaccine was introduced as a routine vaccination in children, rates of acute Hepatitis B has decreased in the United States by 82%. This vaccine is given as a series of shots, the first dose is given at birth, the second between 1 and 2 months, and the third, and possibly fourth, between 6 and 18 months. Some side effects of this vaccination include:

- soreness at injection site (1 in 4 children)
- fever of 99.9 degrees Fahrenheit or higher (1 in 15 children)
- brief fainting spell

Since 1982, when the vaccine became available, more than 100 million people have received the vaccine in the United States and no serious side effects have been reported.

=== Transmission ===
Hepatitis B is spread in several different ways. It can be passed from mother to child during birth, sex with an infected partner, sharing needles, sharing items such as razors or toothbrushes, or direct contact with the blood or open sores of someone who is infected.

=== Symptoms ===
Some mild symptoms of Hepatitis B are:

- fever
- fatigue
- loss of appetite
- abdominal pain
- dark urine
- clay colored bowel movements
- joint pain
- jaundice (yellow color in skin or eyes)

Long term and more severe symptoms include: liver damage, liver failure, liver cancer, and death. Approximately 2,000-4,000 people die every year from Hepatitis related liver disease.

=== Treatment ===
There is currently no medication to treat acute Hepatitis B and those with chronic Hepatitis B need to be monitored regularly for signs of liver disease, and to be evaluated for possible treatment. There are currently a few medications to treat chronic Hepatitis B and new drugs are being researched.

== Rotavirus ==
The rotavirus is most commonly found in infants and young children, but older children and adults can also become infected. Prior to the introduction of the vaccine in 2006, almost all children in the United States became infected with the virus before their 5th birthday. Each year, prior to 2006, rotavirus was responsible for more than 400,000 doctors visits, more than 200,000 emergency room visits, 55,000 to 70,000 hospitalizations, and 20 to 60 deaths in children under the age of 5. Globally, rotavirus is still the cause of approximately half a million deaths each year in children younger than 5 years of age. Unfortunately, there are many strains of rotavirus and the vaccine can not cover all of them, so it is still possible for a child to become infected with rotavirus. Having the illness previously also does not grant immunity, again because there are so many different strains. However, the first infection usually causes the most severe symptoms.

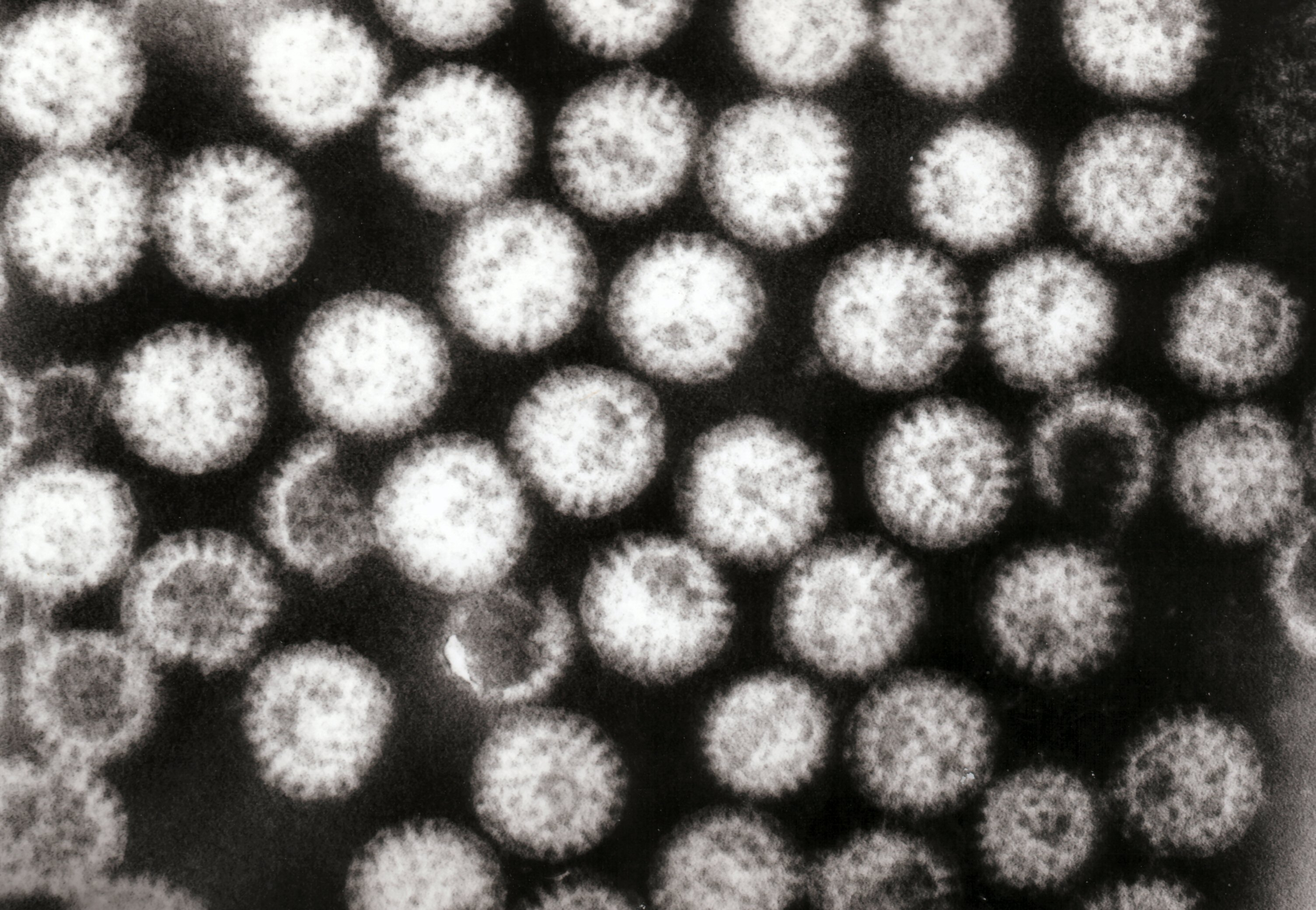
Multiple rotavirus particles

=== Vaccine ===
This vaccine is a little different in that it is a liquid that is given orally, rather than as an injection. This vaccine is a 2 or 3 dose series, depending on the brand of the vaccine, that is given at 2 and 4 months in the 2 dose series and at 2,4 and 6 months in the 3 dose series. Studies show that this vaccine is 85-98% effective against severe rotavirus disease and is 74-87% effective against rotavirus disease of any severity in the first year after the vaccination.

Side effects of the vaccine include both mild and more severe symptoms

mild:

- Irritability
- Mild, temporary diarrhea or vomiting

severe:

- intussusception
  - This is a type of bowel blockage that is treated in a hospital and may require surgery
  - 1 in 20,000 to 1 in 100,000 infants may develop intussusception. If this were to happen, it would occur within a week after the first dose or second dose of the vaccine is given.

=== Transmission ===
The rotavirus is shed in the feces of infected persons and is spread by the fecal oral route, so this virus can be picked up from contaminated hands, objects, food and water. Children are also able to spread the virus before and after they become sick with diarrhea.

=== Symptoms ===
Symptoms appear about two days after exposure and include:

- gastroenteritis (inflammation of the stomach and intestines)
- fever
- vomiting
- severe diarrhea
- abdominal pain
- loss of appetite
- dehydration

Vomiting and watery diarrhea may last from 3 to 8 days

== Diphtheria, pertussis, and tetanus ==
=== DTaP ===
The DTaP is a combination vaccine that covers three diseases; Diphtheria, Pertussis and Tetanus. The DTaP vaccine is given as a 5-shot series at 2, 4, and 6 months, the fourth between 12 and 15 months, and the last between 4–6 years. A booster is recommended to be given between 11 and 12 years of age and is called Tdap. Some potential side effects of DTaP are mild:

- tenderness and redness at the injection site
- drowsiness, headache, diarrhea, fussiness and low-grade fever

uncommon:

- seizure (1 in 14,000 children)
- chronic crying last 3 or more hours (1 in 1,000 children)
- high fever, 105 degrees Fahrenheit or higher (1 in 16,000 children)

severe:

- serious allergic reaction (less than 1 in a million children)
- long term seizures, coma, or lowered consciousness
- permanent brain damage

The severe side effects are so rare that it is hard to correlate the vaccine and these symptoms.

Potential side effects of Tdap:

- pain, tenderness and redness at injection site
- headache
- low fever
- tiredness
- nausea

=== Diphtheria ===
Diphtheria was once a major cause of illness and death among children. In 1921, the U.S. recorded 206,000 cases of diphtheria which resulted in 15,520 deaths. Before the vaccine became widely available in the 1920s, up to half the people that were infected died from this disease. In the past decade, the United States has had fewer than 5 reported cases of diphtheria. Unfortunately, the disease is still an issue globally, with 4,887 cases reported to the World Health Organization (WHO) in 2011.

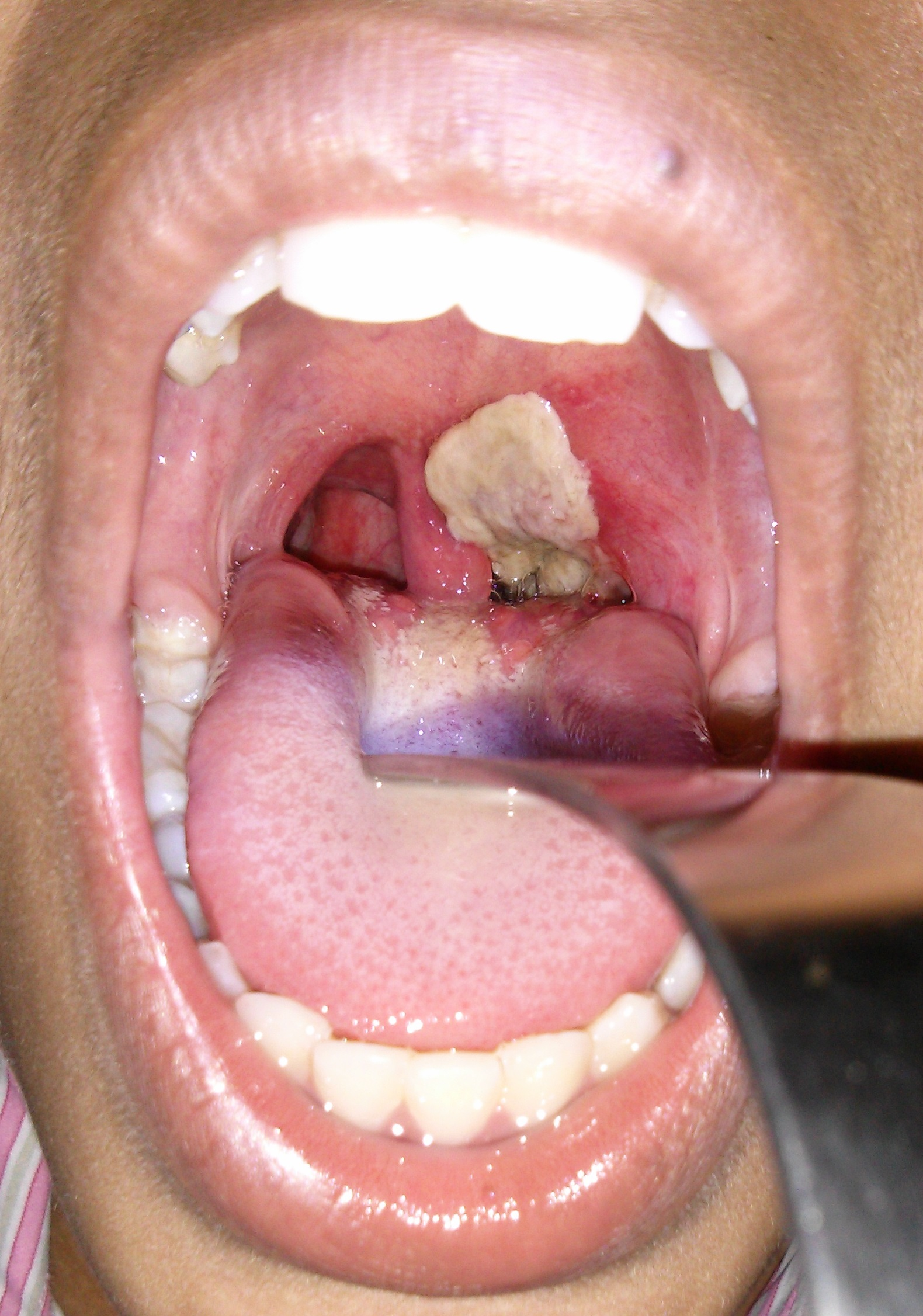
Dirty white pseudomembrane classically seen in diphtheria

==== Transmission ====
Diphtheria is an infection caused by the bacteria Corynebacterium diphtheria. It is spread through respiratory droplets from coughing and sneezing; it can also be spread through skin lesions on the infected person and through contact with contaminated clothes and objects.

==== Symptoms ====
The bacteria that causes Diphtheria infects the respiratory system, produces a toxin that, within 2 to 3 days, kills tissue that then builds up over the nasal tissues, tonsils, voicebox and throat, in a thick gray coating called a "pseudomembrane", making it very hard to breathe and swallow. The bacteria's toxin also causes the following symptoms:

- sore throat
- fever
- swollen glands in the neck

The toxin may also be absorbed into the blood stream and cause damage to the heart, kidneys and nerves causing severe complications such as: blocking of the airway, damage to the heart muscle (myocarditis), inflammation of nerves, which may cause nerve damage (polyneuropathy), paralysis, lung infection (respiratory failure or pneumonia), and death. Even with treatment, 1 in 10 diphtheria patients die. Without treatment as many as half the patients can die from the disease.

=== Pertussis (whooping cough) ===
Pertussis is a highly contagious disease that is caused by the bacteria Bordetella pertussis. The bacteria clings to cilia in the lungs and releases a toxin that damages the cilia and causes inflammation in the respiratory tract.

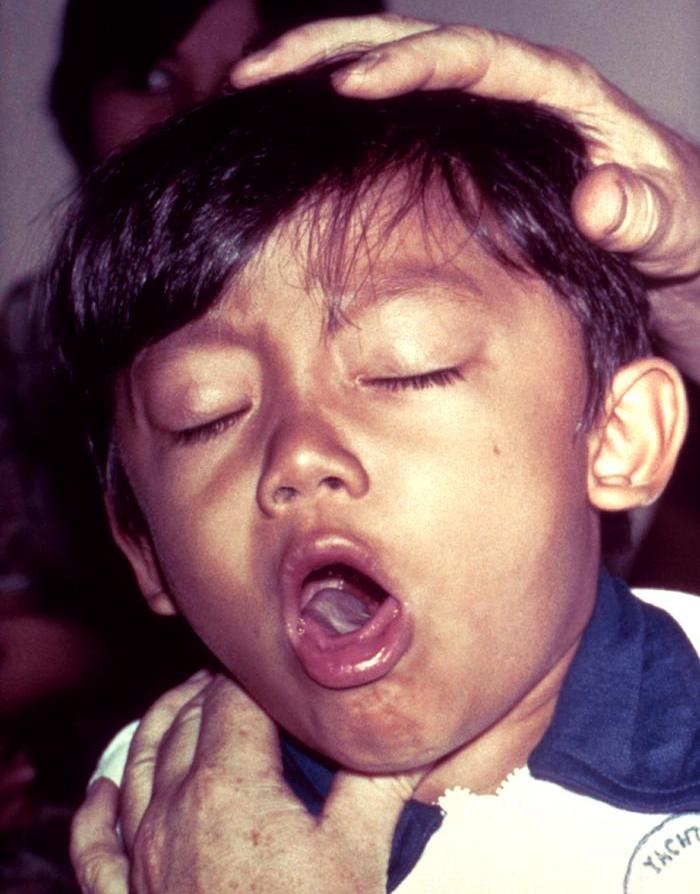
Pertussis

==== Transmission ====
Many infants are infected by older siblings or caregivers that do not even know they have the disease. The bacteria is spread through respiratory secretions, often through coughing or sneezing, or just from breathing in the bacteria while around someone who is infected. Unfortunately, the effectiveness of the Pertussis vaccine is dependent on herd immunity, if pertussis is circulating in the community it is still possible for a vaccinated individual, of any age, to become ill. However, those that are vaccinated may have a less severe infection.

==== Symptoms ====
Symptoms usually develop 7–10 days after being exposed, but sometimes they do not appear for as long as 6 weeks after infection. The disease begins with cold-like symptoms and after a week or two, severe coughing begins that can continue for 10 weeks or more. Infants may develop "apnea" rather than a cough. Apnea is when the child stops breathing momentarily. Approximately half of the infants, younger than one year of age, who get the disease are hospitalized.

- 1 in 4 get pneumonia
- 1 or 2 in 100 will have convulsions (violent, uncontrolled shaking)
- 2/3 will have apnea
- 1 in 300 will have encephalopathy (disease of the brain)
- 1 or 2 in 100 will die

In teens and adults, symptoms include: weight loss, loss of bladder control, passing out, rib fractures from severe coughing, and exhaustion.

If someone with the vaccine becomes infected, in most cases the cough will not last for many days, symptoms occur less often and the percent of children with severe symptoms is less.

=== Tetanus (lockjaw) ===
Tetanus is often referred to as lockjaw due to the fact that the bacteria (Clostridium tetani) cause the muscles of the jaw to tighten, which makes the infected person unable to open their mouth. Today in the United States, tetanus is an uncommon disease with an average of only 29 cases reported per year between 1996 and 2009. Nearly all of these cases are of people who were never vaccinated for tetanus or adults who did not keep up to date with their boosters.

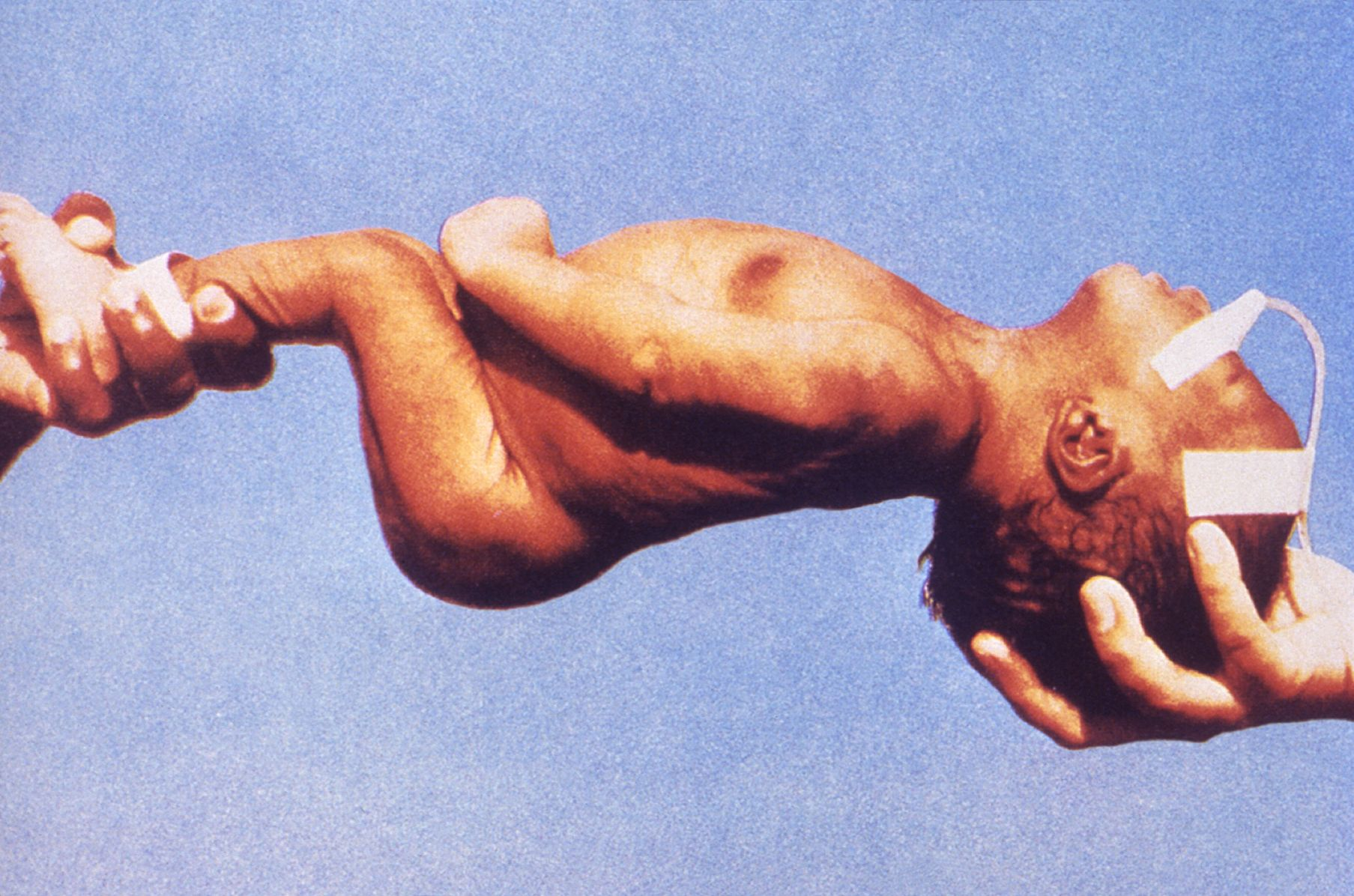
Neonatal tetanus occurs in infants born without protective passive immunity, because the mother is not immune. It usually occurs through infection of the unhealed umbilical stump, particularly when the stump is cut with an unsterilized instrument.

==== Transmission ====
Tetanus is different from other diseases for which there are vaccinations, in that the bacteria are not spread from person to person. The bacteria are found everywhere in the environment, including in dirt, dust and manure. Tetanus is spread when the bacteria enter the body through open wounds such as cuts, puncture wounds, burns, brush injuries and injuries with dead tissues. Although rare, a person may also become infected with tetanus through superficial wounds (just the top layer of skin has been removed), surgical procedures, insect bites, dental infection, compound fractures (where the broken bone has pierced through the skin), chronic sores and infections and intravenous drug use.

==== Symptoms ====
Some common symptoms of tetanus are

- headache
- jaw cramping
- muscle spams (often in the stomach)
- painful muscle stiffness all over the body
- trouble swallowing
- jerking or staring (seizures)
- fever and sweating
- high blood pressure and fast heart rate.

Some complications that can arise from tetanus infection are uncontrolled/involuntary muscular contraction of the vocal chords (laryngospasm), break in the bone, hospital acquired infections, blockage of the main artery of the lung or one of its branches by a blood clot that has traveled from elsewhere in the body through the bloodstream (pulmonary embolism), pneumonia, and breathing difficulty that can lead to death. 10–20% of cases are fatal.

==== Treatment ====
Tetanus is a medical emergency that requires hospitalization, immediate treatment with human tetanus immune globulin (TIG), the tetanus vaccine, drugs to control muscle spasms, aggressive wound care, antibiotics, and depending on how severe the infection is, the patient may need to be put on a ventilator (a machine that breathes for you).

== Haemophilus influenzae type B ==
Haemphilus influenza type B is caused by the bacteria Haemophilus influenzae. This can cause severe infection which occurs mostly in infants and children younger than 5 years old, can cause lifelong disability and can be fatal. There are 6 identified strains of this bacteria and other non-identifiable strains, the one most people are familiar with is Hib. Hib is also the only strain which this vaccine protects against.

=== Vaccine ===
This vaccine protects against Hib, but not the other strains of Haemphilus influenzae. It prevents meningitis, Hib pneumonia, Hib epiglottitis (severe throat infection) and other infections that are a result of this disease. This is a series of 4 shots given at 2, 4, 6 months of age and the last is given between 12 and 15 months of age. Being infected with the disease previously does not grant immunity and it is therefore important to be vaccinated even if the disease has been contracted before.

Some side effects of this vaccine are:

- redness, warmth or swelling at the injection site
- fever

These problems are uncommon, and if they occur, usually begin soon after the injection and last only 2 to 3 days. More serious complications may include a brief fainting spell or, very rarely, temporary severe shoulder pain and limited range of motion of the arm may happen after the injection.

=== Transmission ===
The bacteria are spread person to person by direct contact or through respiratory secretions ejected when coughing or sneezing. Most of the time the disease is spread by people that have the bacteria in their nose and throat but are asymptomatic (do not have symptoms). It is not certain how long it takes from the time you are infected to the time you get sick, but it could be only a few days.

=== Symptoms ===
The symptoms for this disease vary, depending on the part of the body that is infected.

Some side effects are:

- bronchitis
- ear infections
- pneumonia
- bacteremia (bloodstream infection); bacteremia can result in the loss of limbs
- meningitis (infection of the covering of the brain and spinal cord); meningitis can result in brain damage and/or hearing loss

Many infections caused by this disease can result in death. However, complications are rare and antibiotics may be given to prevent these severe complications.

=== Treatment ===
Hib is usually treated with antibiotics over the course of 10 days, but most cases of invasive disease (bacteria that gets into normally bacteria-free parts of the body like the blood or spinal fluid) requires hospitalization. Even with antibiotic treatments, 3-6% of all children with Hib meningitis die from the disease.

== Pneumococcal ==
Pneumococcal disease is caused by the bacteria Streptococcus pneumoniae, also known as pneumococcus. This bacteria can cause many types of illnesses including ear infections, pneumonia, and meningitis.

=== Vaccine ===
This vaccine protects from more than 90 types of pneumococcal bacteria. The pneumococcal conjugate vaccine (PCV13 or Prevnar13) protects against the 13 types of bacteria that cause most of the severe illness in children. It can also help prevent ear infections. Previous infection from the disease does not grant immunity from future infection since there are so many strains, so it is important to be vaccinated against them. Getting the flu also increases a person's risk for getting pneumococcal disease. PCV13 is a series of 4 shots given at 2, 4, and 6 months of age. The last is given between 12 and 15 months of age.

Side effects of this vaccine may include:

- about half the children become drowsy
- temporary loss of appetite
- redness or tenderness at injection site
- 1 in 3 have swelling at injection site
- about 1 in 3 have mild fever
- about 1 in 20 have a higher fever (102.2 degrees Fahrenheit or higher)
- up to 8 in 10 become fussy or irritable

=== Symptoms ===
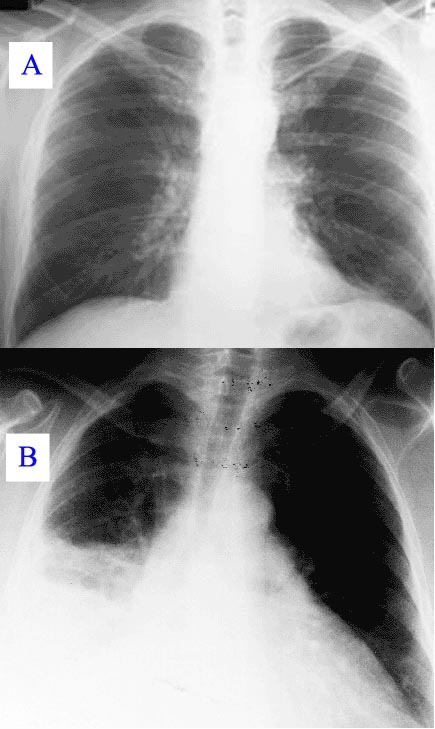
Pneumonia x-ray

Pneumonia is the most common form of the disease, symptoms include

- fever and chills
- cough
- rapid or difficulty breathing
- chest pain

It can also result in meningitis, symptoms include

- stiff neck
- fever and headache
- pain when looking into bright lights
- confusion
- in babies
  - poor eating and drinking
  - low alertness
  - vomiting

Bacteremia and sepsis are blood infections which can also be a result, symptoms include fever, chills, and low alertness. Up to half of all middle ear infections are caused by pneumococcal disease, symptoms include ear pain, a red, swollen ear drum, and sometimes fever and sleepiness. These illnesses may also lead to death

=== Treatments ===
Early diagnosis and treatment are very important for invasive pneumococcal disease. Most of the time it is treated with antibiotics, but many strains have become resistant to the antibiotics used to treat these infections. In some areas of the United States, up to 15% of infections are resistant to penicillin. With is success of the pneumococcal disease vaccine, much less antibiotic-resistant infections have been seen.

== Polio ==
Poliomyelitis, known as the disease Polio, is a highly infectious disease caused by a virus that lives in the throat and intestinal tract of those infected with it. It caused severe illness in thousands of people in the United States each year until the vaccine was introduced in 1955. Most people infected have no symptoms, but for less than 1% of people who develop paralysis it can lead to permanent disability and even death.

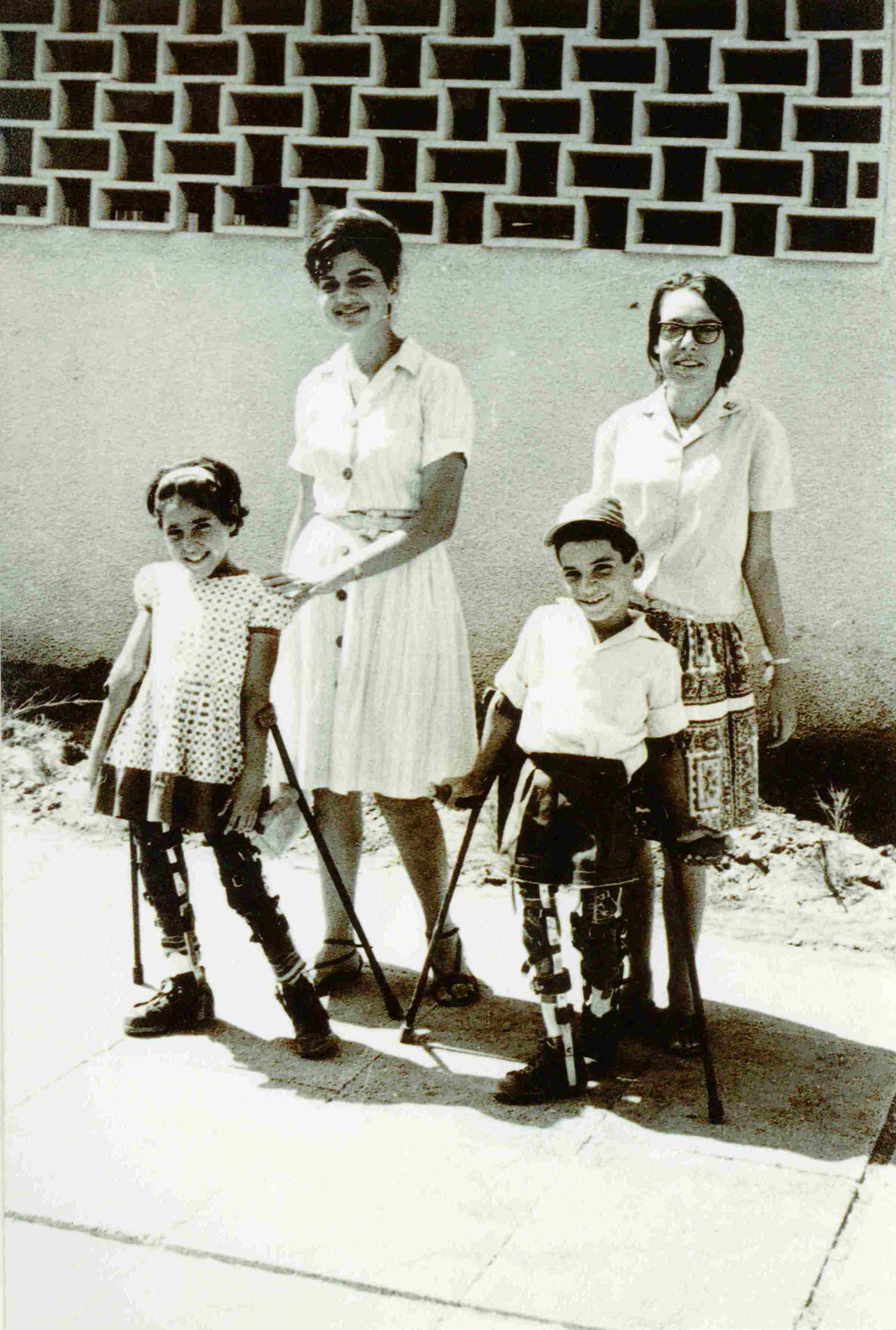
Children disabled by polio in Israel

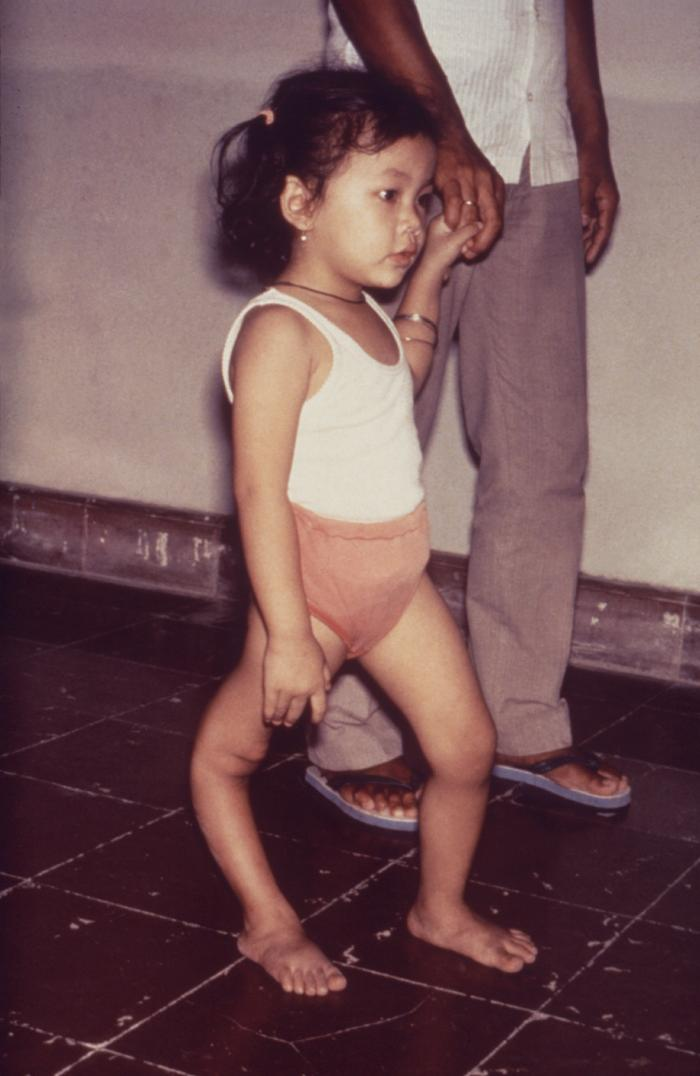
This unvaccinated child's leg became deformed as a result of Polio.

=== Vaccine ===
There are two different types of vaccine for Polio. One is an inactivated form of the virus (IPV) which is given as a shot. This is the only form that is used in the United States. The other form is given orally (OPV) and is used all over the world. OPV has a risk of causing vaccine-associated paralytic poliomyelitis (VAPP) which occurred in one child out of every 2.4 million. But it does have advantages over IPV in that it provides intestinal immunity and provides secondary spread of the vaccine to unprotected people that come in contact with the vaccinated person. A person is considered to be fully immunized if they have received a primary series of at least three doses of IPV, OPV, or four doses of any combination of IPV and OPV. These doses are given at 2, and 4 months of age, again between 6 and 18 months of age. A booster is given between 4 and 6 years. Some people who get IPV may have soreness at the injection site, but the vaccine as it is today is not known to cause any serious problems and most people have no problems at all.

=== Transmission ===
Polio is spread person to person through contact with the feces of an infected person and may be spread through oral and nasal secretions.

=== Symptoms ===
Approximately 72% of people infected with Polio have no symptoms, 24% have minor symptoms which can include

- fever
- fatigue
- nausea
- headache
- flu-like symptoms
- stiffness in the neck and back
- pain in the limbs

These minor symptoms often resolve completely. Fewer than 1% of cases result in permanent paralysis of the limbs (usually in the legs). Of that 1%, 5-10% of people die when the paralysis strikes the respiratory muscles.

== Influenza ==
Influenza is caused by the influenza virus, it is a contagious disease that spreads around the United States every winter, usually between October and May. Anyone can get the flu, but the risk is highest among children and each year thousands of people die from the flu and many more are hospitalized.

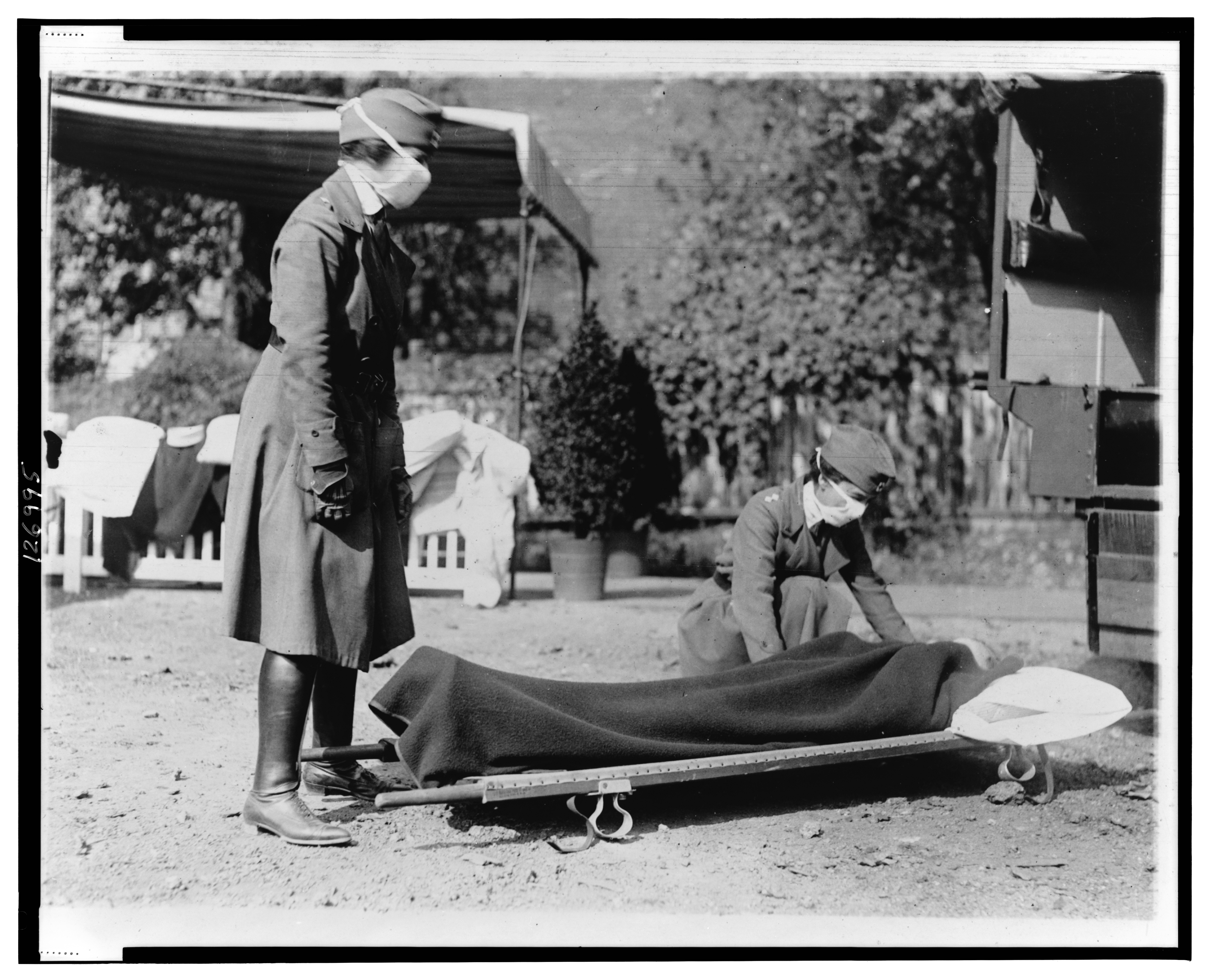
1918 flu outbreak

=== Vaccine ===
The influenza vaccine comes in two forms, the inactivated form which is what is typically thought of as the "flu shot", and a live but attenuated (weakened) form that is sprayed into the nostrils. it is recommended to get the flu shot each year since it is remade each year to protect against the viruses that are most likely to cause disease that year. Unfortunately there are a vast array of strains of influenza, so a single vaccine can not prevent all of them. The shot prevents 3 or 4 different influenza viruses and it takes about 2 weeks after the injection for protection to develop. This protection lasts from several months to a year. Multi-dose vials of the flu shot contain thimerosal which was once believed to cause autism in children. Studies have shown that this correlation between thimerosal and autism does not exist. Thimerosal is used in these multi-dose vials to prevent contamination from multiple preparations. Contamination of the vaccine could cause serious infection. In a .5mL dose (which is in a single flu shot), there is 25 μg (micrograms) of mercury. This is 0.01% of the dose. Single dose vials do not contain thimerosal.

Some side effects of the inactivated vaccine include

- soreness, redness or swelling at injection site
- hoarseness
- sore, red or itchy eyes
- fever
- aches
- headache
- itching
- fatigue

If these problems occur, they usually begin soon after the vaccine is given and last 1 or two days.

More severe complications could include:

- higher risk for seizures cause by fever in small children who get IPV and PCV13 (pneumococcal vaccine) at the same time
- IPV may be associated with Guillain–Barré syndrome (GBS) (no more than 1 or 2 per million)

The attenuated vaccine may have slightly different symptoms which may include

- runny nose, nasal congestion or cough
- fever
- headache and muscle ache
- wheezing
- abdominal pain or occasional vomiting or diarrhea

It is not possible to become infected with influenza from getting either form of the vaccine since the full, live virus is not introduced to the body.

=== Transmission ===
Influenza is spread through coughing, sneezing and close contact with infected persons.

=== Symptoms ===
Symptoms come on suddenly and last for several days, these symptoms can include

- fever and chills
- muscle aches
- fatigue
- cough
- headache
- runny or stuffy nose

Complications can arise from this disease and can include pneumonia, diarrhea, and seizures in children.

== Varicella (chickenpox) ==
Varicella, commonly known as chickenpox, is a highly contagious disease that is very uncomfortable and sometimes serious. It is caused by the varicella-zoster virus (VZV). Before the vaccine, about 4 million people in the United States would develop chickenpox annually. Of these people, about 10,600 would require hospitalization and 100 to 150 would die.

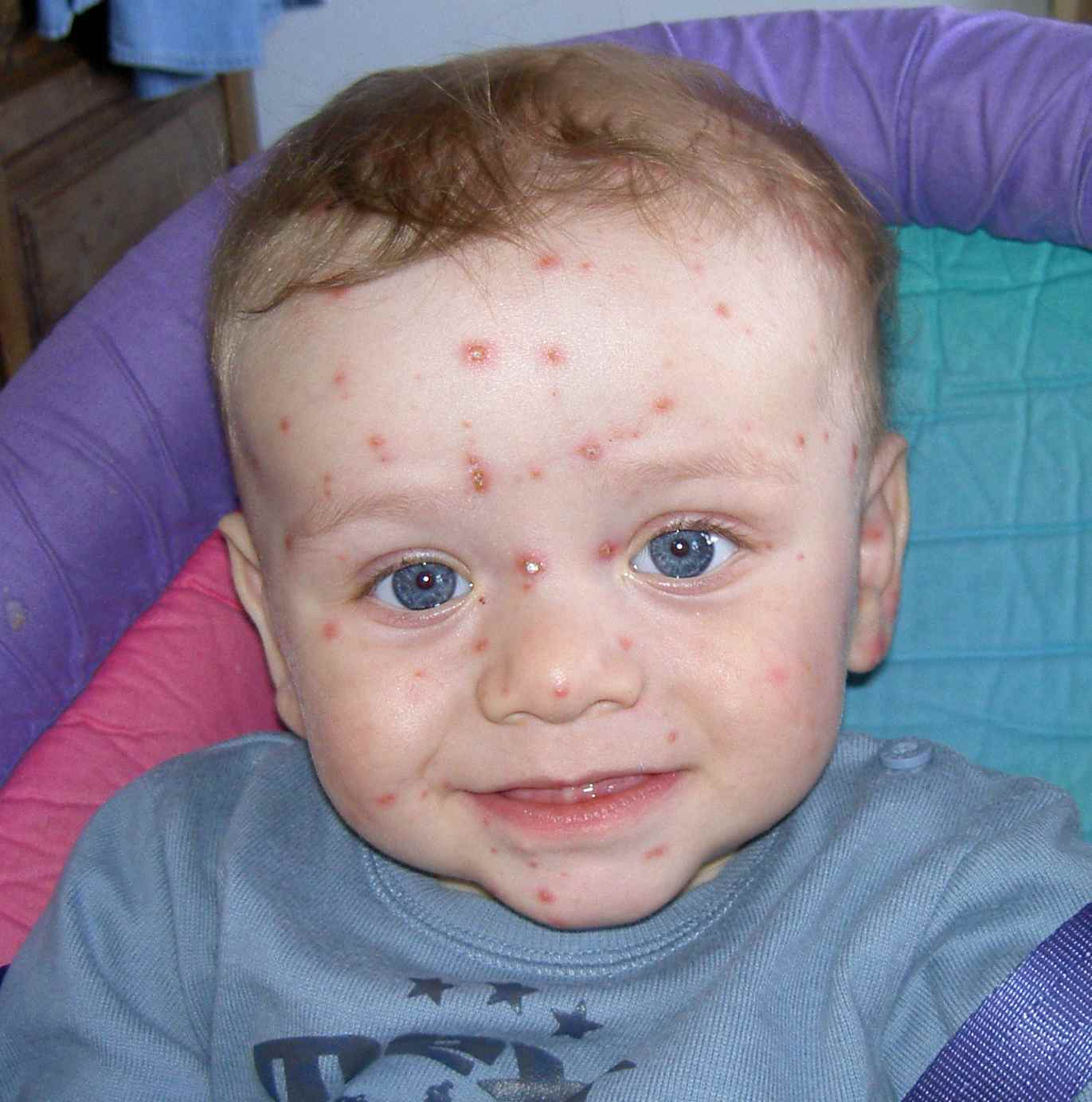
A child with chickenpox

=== Vaccine ===
Most people who are vaccinated will not develop chickenpox. The vaccine also prevents almost all severe cases of the disease. About 25–30% of the people who develop chickenpox after vaccination will experience a case that is as severe as those of unvaccinated people. The varicella vaccine is given between 12 and 15 months of age.

Side effects of the vaccine can include:

- soreness, redness and/or rash at the injection site (1 in 5 children)
- fever (1 in 10 or fewer)
- rash
  - it is possible for those who develop a rash to spread the varicella vaccine virus to other, unprotected people. The Centers for Disease Control and Prevention advise that anyone who develops a rash after vaccination stay away from infants and those with weakened immune systems until the rash subsides

Very rare serious side effects can include: seizure, often associated with fever, pneumonia, and other serious problems, such as an infection of the brain and/or spinal cord covering, have occurred after vaccination. However, these are so rare that experts cannot tell whether they are caused by the vaccine or not. If they are, it is extremely rare.

=== Transmission ===
Varicella spreads person to person through the air from coughing or sneezing, touching or breathing in the virus that comes from the chickenpox blisters, and can be spread from people with shingles. It takes 10 to 21 days after exposure to develop symptoms and it lasts about 5–10 days. For the most part, getting the chickenpox provides immunity for life. Although uncommon, it is possible for some people to get chickenpox more than once.

=== Symptoms ===
Symptoms of varicella may include:

- rash that turns into itchy, fluid filled blisters that eventually scab over
  - it usually takes about a week for all blisters to turn into scabs.
- high fever
- tiredness
- loss of appetite
- headache

Complications that can arise are dehydration, pneumonia, bleeding problems, infection or inflammation of the brain (encephalitis, cerebellar ataxia), bacterial infections of the skin and soft tissues in children including Group A streptococcal infections, blood stream infections (sepsis), toxic shock syndrome, bone infections, and joint infections. Some people with serious complications may need to be hospitalized, and complications may be fatal.

== Hepatitis A ==
Hepatitis A, like Hepatitis B is inflammation of the liver. Hepatitis A is a contagious liver disease that results form infection with the Hepatitis A virus. It can range from a mild illness lasting a few weeks to a severe illness lasting several months.

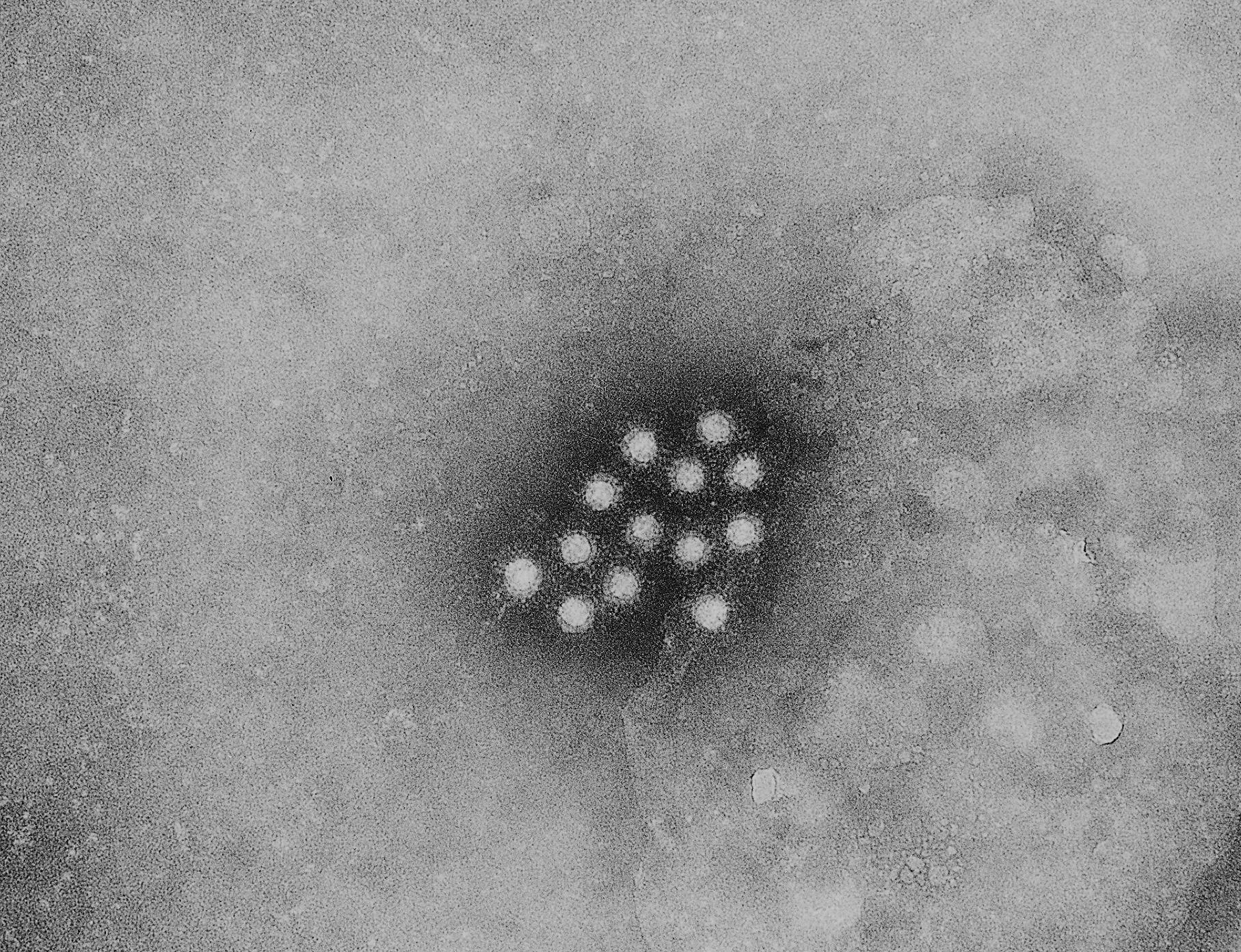
Hepatitis A virus 01

=== Vaccine ===
Protection begins at about 2 to 4 weeks after the first injection. This is a series of 2 shots given between 12 and 23 months of age.

Side Effects can include

- soreness at the injection site (1 in 2 adults, 1 in 6 children)
- headache (1 in 6 adults and 1 in 25 children)
- loss of appetite (1 in 12 children)
- tiredness (1 in 14 adults)

These problems usually only last 1 or 2 days.

=== Transmission ===
Hepatitis A is usually spread when the virus is taken in through the mouth through coming in contact with objects, food, or drinks that have been contaminated by the feces of an infected person. It also spreads from person to person contact such as when there is improper hand washing after bathroom use, changing diapers, or sexual contact with an infected partner (not limited to anal-to-oral contact). Contaminated food or water is more common in areas with poor sanitary conditions or poor personal hygiene. In the United States, chlorination of the water kills Hepatitis A virus that enters the water supply. Hepatitis A can live outside the body for months. High temperatures (185 degrees Fahrenheit for at least 1 minute) can kill the virus, freezing can not.

=== Symptoms ===
Symptoms usually occur anywhere from 2 to 6 weeks after exposure, develop over a period and last less than 2 months, although some people have been ill for as long as 6 months. It can be spread even if the infected person has no symptoms, and it does not always cause symptoms. Symptoms include:

- fever
- fatigue
- loss of appetite
- nausea
- vomiting
- abdominal pain
- dark urine
- clay-colored bowel movements
- joint pain
- jaundice (a yellowing of the skin or eyes)

Hepatitis A can also cause liver failure and death, although this is rare and occurs more commonly in individuals that are 50 years of age or older and those with other liver disease such as Hepatitis B or C. There is currently no treatment for Hepatitis A and some may need to be hospitalized due to complications.

== Measles, mumps and rubella ==
=== MMR Vaccine ===
For this there are two different vaccines, the MMR and the MMRV. The MMR protects against measles, mumps and rubella and is given in 2 doses between 12 and 15 months of age. The MMRV protects against measles, mumps, rubella and varicella.

Some side effects of the MMR vaccine are

- fever (1 in 6)
- mild rash (1 in 20)
- swelling of the glands in cheeks or neck (1 in 75)

If these occur, it is usually within 7–12 days after the shot. They occur less often after the second dose

Some more moderate side effects are

- seizure caused by fever (1 in 3,000)
- temporary pain and stiffness in the joints, mostly in teenage or adult women (1 in 4)
- temporary low platelet count, which can cause a bleeding disorder (1 in 30,000)

There are some purported side effects that happen so rarely it is not proven that they are caused by the vaccine, they include deafness, long-term seizures, coma or lowered consciousness, and permanent brain damage.

=== Measles ===
Measles is the most deadly of all childhood rash/fever illnesses. Measles is a respiratory disease caused by the virus of the same name, it normally grows in the cells that line the back of the throat and lungs. In pregnant women in can cause miscarriages or pre-mature births. While measles is almost gone from the United States, it still kills about 164,000 people each year around the world. In developing countries that suffer from malnutrition and vitamin A deficiency, measles has been known to kill as many as 1 out of 4 people and it is the leading cause of blindness among African children.

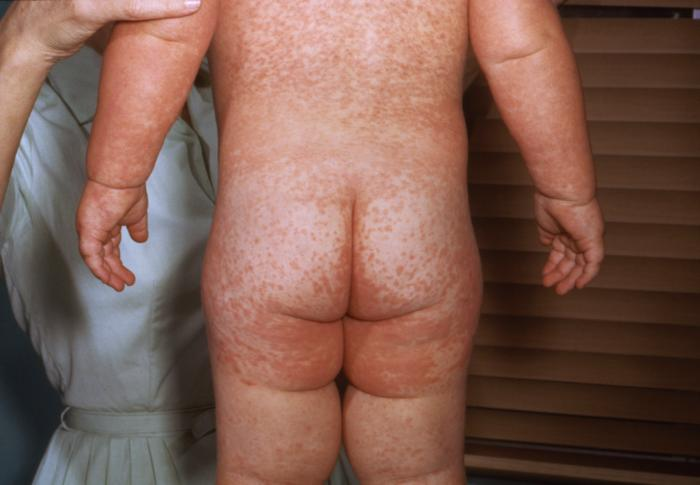
A child with measles showing the characteristic red blotchy rash on his buttocks and back during the 3rd day of the rash

==== Transmission ====
Measles spreads from person to person and is extremely contagious, 90% of people close to the infected individual that are not immune will become infected as well. The virus is spread through coughing, sneezing and touching infected surfaces. The virus can live on surfaces for up to 2 hours after contaminated.

==== Symptoms ====
There are several symptoms of measles, they can be

- blotchy rash
- fever
- cough
- runny nose
- red watery eyes (conjunctivitis)
- feeling run down, achy (malaise)
- tiny white spots with blueish-white centers are found inside the mouth (Koplik's spots)

There are several complications that can arise from getting measles, about 30% of cases develop one or more complications which are

- pneumonia (1 in 20); this complication is most often the cause of death in young children
- ear infections; can result in permanent hearing loss
- diarrhea (8% of cases)
- encephalitis (1 in 1,000); inflammation in the brain that can lead to convulsions and can leave the child deaf or mentally impaired
- Subacute Sclerosing Panencepalitis (SSPE)
  - very rare, but fatal degenerative disease of the central nervous system that results from a measles virus infection acquired earlier in life.
  - 4-11 cases per 100,000 in the United States from 1989 to 1991
  - On average, symptoms begin to show 7 to 10 years after the original measles infection, but they can appear anytime from 1 month to 27 years after infection. Symptoms of SSPE are
    - changes in personality
    - gradual mental deterioration
    - myoclonia (muscle spasms)
    - stages vary from person to person, and cognitive decline may continue for years before the onset of more severe neuromuscular disorders.
    - There are some reports remissions and treatments, but the average survival is 1 to 2 years.
  - All genetic analyses of SSPE patients reveal sequences of wild-type measles, never the vaccine virus. Thusly, there is no evidence to show that the measles vaccine can cause SSPE

For every 1,000 children that get measles, 1 or 2 will die from it.

=== Mumps ===
Mumps is a contagious disease caused by the virus by the same name. Since most people in the United States have been vaccinated, mumps is now a rare disease in this country. Currently there are no specific treatments for mumps.

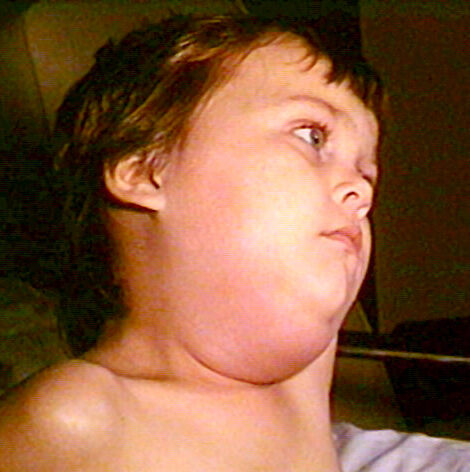
A child with swelling of the parotid glands characteristic of mumps

==== Transmission ====
Mumps is spread person to person by droplets of saliva or mucus from the mouth, nose or throat of an infected person. This is done through coughing, sneezing, talking, and coming into contact with contaminated items. Transmission likely occurs before the salivary glands swell and up to 5 days after the swelling begins.

==== Symptoms ====
Up to half the people who get mumps have very mild or no symptoms and do not know they are infected. Symptoms include

- fever
- headache
- muscle aches
- tiredness
- loss of appetite
- swollen and tender salivary glands under the ears on one or both sides (parotitis)

Symptoms typically appear 16–18 days after infection, but this period can range from 12 to 25 days after infection, and the people usually recover after a week or two.

Complications that can arise from the mumps infection are inflammation of the brain and/or tissues covering the brain and spinal cord (encephalitis/meningitis), deafnes, inflammation of the testicles (orchitis) in males who have reached puberty, and inflammation of the ovaries (oophoritis) and/or breasts (mastitis) in females who have reached puberty.

=== Rubella ===
Rubella is also known as German Measles or three day measles, it is a contagious disease caused by a virus.

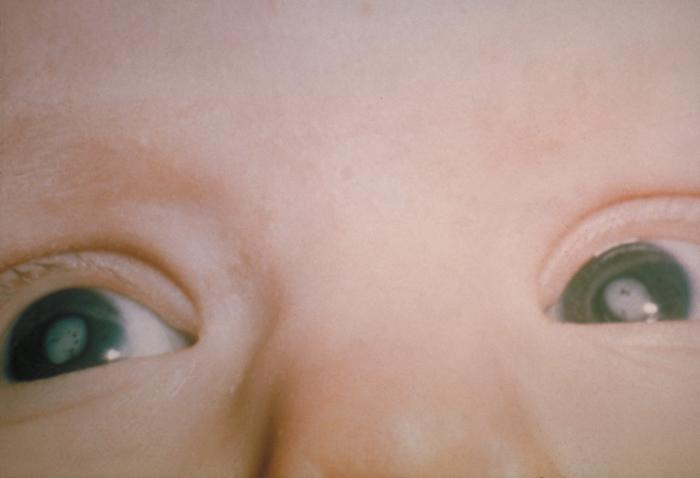
Cataracts due to Congenital Rubella Syndrome (CRS)

==== Transmission ====
Rubella is spread from person to person through coughing and sneezing

==== Symptoms ====
About half the people that get rubella do not have symptoms. Some symptoms that can arise are

- rash that starts on the face and spreads to the rest of the body
- a low fever (less than 101 degrees Fahrenheit)

These symptoms usually only last 2 or 3 days. Rubella is most dangerous for a pregnant woman's fetus and this is where most complications occur. Complications can include miscarriage, deafness, intellectual disability, heart defects, liver and spleen damage, and cataracts

== Meningococcal ==
Meningococcal disease refers to any illness that is caused by the bacteria Neisseria meningitidis also known as meningococcus. About 10% of people with this infection have bacteria in the back of their nose and throat but have no signs or symptoms. The illness most people are familiar with is meningococcal meningitis, this causes the protective membranes covering the brain and spinal cord, known as meninges, to become infected and swell.

=== Vaccine ===
The Meningococcal Conjugate Vaccine (MCV4) is given between the ages of 11 and 12 years of age. As many as half the people who get meningococcal vaccines have mild side effect which include redness or pain at injection site, and a small percentage of people develop a fever. These symptoms usually only last 1 or 2 days

=== Transmission ===
Meningococcus if spread from person to person through the exchange of respiratory and throat secretions such as spit. It is not spread by casual contact or by simply breathing the air where a person with the disease has been. People who are in close contact with someone who has the disease are at increased risk of infection. In the case of infection, these people are contacted to receive prophylaxis which is when a person is treated with antibiotics to prevent infection from the disease.

=== Symptoms ===
Symptoms appear quickly over the course of several days and develop within 3–7 days after exposure. The symptoms of meningococcal disease are

- sudden onset of fever
- headache
- stiff neck
- nausea
- vomiting
- photophobia (increased sensitivity to light)
- altered mental status (confusion)

In newborns and infants classic symptoms may be absent or difficult to notice. They may appear slow or inactive, irritable, vomiting or feeding poorly.

Meningococcal Septicemis (aka. Meningococcemia) is a bloodstream infection caused by the Neisseria meningitides bacteria. This is a more deadly and dangerous illness in which bacteria get in the bloodstream and multiply, damaging the walls of the blood vessels and causing bleeding into the skin and organ. Symptoms include

- fatigue
- vomiting
- cold hands and feet
- cold chills
- severe aches or pain in the muscles, joints, chest or abdomen
- rapid breathing
- diarrhea
- in later stages, a dark purple rash

This is very serious and can be fatal. In fatal cases death can occur in as little as a few hours. In non-fatal cases, permanent disabilities can include hearing loss and brain damage.

=== Treatment ===
In the case of infection, antibiotics are to be given right away which should reduce the risk of dying, but sometimes the infection has caused too much damage to the body for the antibiotics to prevent death or serious long-term problems. Even with antibiotic treatment, people die in about 10-15% of cases. About 11-19% of survivors will have long-term disabilities, such as loss of limbs, deafness, nervous system problems, or brain damage. Depending on how serious the infection is, other treatments such as breathing support, medications to treat low blood pressure, and wound care for damaged skin by be necessary.

== Human papillomavirus ==
The human papillomavirus is the most common sexually transmitted disease and there are more than 40 types of HPV. HPV can also infect the mouth and throat and most people that are infected do not know they have it.

=== Vaccine ===
There are two types of vaccines, Cervarix and Gardasil. They are both a three-dose series of injections that are recommended at 11 to 12 years of age, but is commonly given to people older than 12. Cervarix is used around the world and is considered very safe. Some side effects that may arise are:

- pain at injection site (9 in 10)
- redness or swelling at injection site (1 in 2)
- fever of 99.5 degrees Fahrenheit or higher (1 in 8)
- headache or fatigue (1 in 2)
- nausea, vomiting, diarrhea, or abdominal pain (1 in 4)
- brief fainting

Gardasil is used more commonly in the United States but it also used around the world and is also considered very safe. Some side effects that may arise are:

- pain at injection site (8 in 10)
- redness or swelling at injection site (1 in 4)
- fever
  - mild (100 degrees Fahrenheit) (1 in 10)
  - moderate (102 degrees Fahrenheit) (1 in 65)
- headache (1 in 3)
- brief fainting

=== Transmission ===
HPV is passed on through genital contact, most often during vaginal and anal sex, and can be passed on even if the infected partner has no symptoms. Very rarely a pregnant woman can pass HPV to her baby during delivery. The child can develop recurrent respiratory papillomatosis (RRP), which is a rare condition in which warts grow in the throat. It is also known as juvenile-onset recurrent respiratory papillomatosis (JORRP).

=== Symptoms ===
Most people that are infected do not develop symptoms or health problems. In 90% of cases, the body's immune system clears HPV within two years. Sometimes, certain types of HPV can cause genital warts in males and females. Although rare, it may also cause warts to grow in the throat. Other HPV types can cause normal cells in the body to turn abnormal, and might lead to cancer over time such as cervical cancer. The types of HPV that cause warts are not the same types that cause cancer.

== Anti-vaccination ==
In 1998, The Lancet published a paper co-authored by Andrew Wakefield and colleagues that falsely suggested a link between the MMR vaccine and autism, substantially boosting the modern anti-vaccination movement. It was later revealed by investigative journalist Brian Deer that Wakefield's research was fraudulent and that he had undeclared conflicts of interest. The Lancet formally retracted the paper in 2010, the same year the United Kingdom's General Medical Council revoked Wakefield's medical license. It is scientific consensus that there is no link, causal or otherwise, between any vaccine or vaccine ingredient and autism; this consensus is based on extensive research conducted in the decades since the release of Wakefield's 1998 paper.
