= Boyd Haley =

American chemist (born 1940)

Boyd Eugene Haley
- Born: September 22, 1940 (age 85); Greensburg, Indiana
- Education: Franklin College, University of Idaho, Washington State University
- Known for: Photoaffinity labeling Anti-vaccine activism
- Spouse: Sandy Haley
- Awards: Sigma Xi
- Scientific career
- Workplaces: University of Wyoming, University of Kentucky
- Thesis: Gamma-fluoro-adenosinetriphosphate: I. Synthesis and properties; II. Interaction with myosin, heavy meromyosin, and fumarase. (1971)

Boyd Eugene Haley (born September 22, 1940, Greensburg, Indiana) is an American anti-vaccine activist and retired professor of chemistry at the University of Kentucky.

== Education and career ==
A native of Greensburg, Indiana, Haley graduated from its New Point High School in 1959. Four years later, he received a bachelor's degree from Franklin College in Franklin, Indiana, and then entered a teaching fellowship at Howard University. Thereafter, he served as a U.S. Army medic for several years.

In 1967, Haley obtained an M.S. degree from the University of Idaho. He then entered a doctoral program at Washington State University, where he worked "to make chemical modifications on ATP to try to identify how and exactly where ATP binds to cause muscle movement." In 1971, WSU granted him his Ph.D. degree in chemistry-biochemistry.

For three years, Haley served as a postdoctoral scholar at Yale University. From 1974 to 1985, he was a professor at the University of Wyoming. hereafter, he was appointed professor of medicinal chemistry at the University of Kentucky, whose chemistry department he became chairperson of in 1997. He is now professor emeritus.

== Basic research ==
In 1992, Haley and a colleague, upon examining cerebrospinal fluid, reported levels of glutamine synthetase considerably higher in cases of Alzheimer's disease than in a control group, and suggested that this could be a biomarker to aid diagnosis.

In 2005, Haley reproduced findings of gold salt removing mercury from molecules, and inferred support for the possibility of gold salts removing mercury from biological proteins. Yet Haley noted that the gold salts could themselves be toxic, and called for the extreme caution before applying gold salts in medical treatment.

== Thimerosal controversy ==
Haley argues that mercury exposure via dental amalgams and vaccinations may cause neurological impairments and diseases, such as autism and Alzheimer's disease. The United States Public Health Service and the American Dental Association reject these claims.

Haley has appeared in court as an expert witness against vaccine manufacturers, stating his belief that thimerosal causes autism, but his testimony has not been accepted. In 2008 a judge ruled that his "lack of expertise in genetics, epidemiology, and child neurology make it impossible for him to supply the necessary factual basis to support his testimony".

Haley has labeled autism as "mad child disease" (akin to mad cow disease), which many autistic individuals and their parents have found highly offensive.

== Supplement marketing ==
Haley is the founder of CTI Science, a Lexington, Kentucky-based biotechnology firm. CTI marketed a product, OSR#1, for human consumption; it was described as an "antioxidant" dietary supplement that is a powerful chelator from a family originally developed to remove heavy metals from soil and acid mine drainage. In June 2008, an FDA toxicologist questioned "on what basis the product could be expected to be safe and could be considered a dietary ingredient", but CTI Science and Haley had not responded as of January 2010. The testing was described as incomplete and indicating toxicity. On June 17, 2010, the FDA sent a warning letter noting five potential violations, expressing concern over the testing, and requiring a response in 15 days. Although Haley wrote an op-ed for the Lexington Herald-Leader, the FDA did not receive a formal response, and OSR#1 was withdrawn from the market. In July 2014, CTI Science was acquired by Ireland-based EmeraMed Limited, which rebranded Haley's antioxidant/chelator as Emeramide and, as of 2026, is still seeking regulatory approval for the drug in the United States, the European Union, and South America. As of 2026, Haley is EmeraMed's chief scientist and CEO.
