= Ashani Weeraratna =

Sri Lankan-American cancer researcher

- Born: Ashani Tanuja Weeraratna; 1970 or 1971 (age 54–55)
- Citizenship: United States
- Board member of: National Cancer Advisory Board; American Association for Cancer Research

Academic background
- Education: St. Mary's College of Maryland (B.A.); George Washington University (MPhil, Ph.D.)
- Doctoral advisor: Steven Patierno

Academic work
- Discipline: Cancer research
- Sub-discipline: Melanoma; Aging tumor microenvironment;
- Institutions: Wistar Institute; Johns Hopkins University
- Website: Weeraratna Faculty Website

Ashani Tanuja Weeraratna (born 1970 or 1971) is a Sri Lanka-born American cancer researcher whose work focuses on how changes in the tumor microenvironment, especially aging, can change melanoma growth and the development of therapeutic resistance. She is a Bloomberg Distinguished Professor of cancer biology and the E.V. McCollum Professor and chair of the department of biochemistry and molecular biology at the Johns Hopkins Bloomberg School of Public Health. Weeraratna is a member of the National Cancer Advisory Board, which advises and assists the director of the National Cancer Institute on the activities of the national cancer program.

== Early life and education ==
Weeraratna was born in Sri Lanka and raised in Lesotho. In 1988, she left Lesotho at the age of 17 to study biology at St. Mary's College of Maryland, where she earned a bachelor's degree in 1991. Weeraratna obtained a master's in philosophy from George Washington University in 1997. She earned a doctorate in molecular and cellular oncology from the Columbian College of Arts and Sciences of the George Washington University Medical Center. From 1998 to 2000, Weeraratna completed post-graduate training and was a postdoctoral fellow in experimental therapeutics and pharmacology at the Johns Hopkins Sidney Kimmel Comprehensive Cancer Center, then known as the Johns Hopkins Oncology Center. She then joined the laboratory of Jeff Trent, then scientific director of the National Human Genome Research Institute, at the National Institutes of Health. There, she followed up on Trent and Michael Bittner's discovery of the roles of non-canonical Wnt signaling molecule Wnt5A in melanoma. This work led her to investigate the role of Wnt5A in melanoma metastasis, a research focus that she has continued to pursue throughout her career.

== Career ==
=== Cancer research ===
In 2007, Weeraratna worked in the Laboratory of Immunology at the National Institute on Aging. Weeraratna joined the Wistar Institute in 2011, first as an assistant professor and then as an associate professor and program leader of the Tumor Microenvironment and Metastasis Program at the Wistar Institute. In 2015, her research encompassed the effects of aging on skin and the corresponding changes in tumor growth. In 2016, she was named the Ira Brind associate professor at the Wistar Institute. When Weeraratna received the professorship, Wistar Institute president and CEO, Dario Altieri remarked that "...she is changing the way we understand melanoma, as she and her team seek ways to prevent and treat this dangerous disease." In 2018, Weeraratna became a full professor and co-program leader of the Immunology, Microenvironment, and Metastasis Program at the Wistar Institute.

Weeraratna joined Johns Hopkins University in 2019 as a Bloomberg Distinguished Professor of cancer biology. She is the first woman to hold the E.V. McCollum Professorship and chair the department of biochemistry and molecular biology at the Johns Hopkins Bloomberg School of Public Health (JHSPH). In this role, she has continued her melanoma research and expanded the aging and cancer programs at JHSPH. Weeraratna holds joint appointments in the Johns Hopkins School of Medicine department of oncology and the Sidney Kimmel Comprehensive Cancer Center.

In 2020-2021, Weeraratna served as president of the Society for Melanoma Research. In September 2021, President Joe Biden appointed Weeraratna as one of seven clinicians and researchers to the National Cancer Advisory Board, which advises the director of the National Cancer Institute on activities of the national cancer program. In 2026, she was elected to the Board of Directors of the American Association for Cancer Research

== Selected Publications ==
- Weeraratna, Ashani (2021). Is Cancer Inevitable? (1st ed.). Johns Hopkins University Press. ISBN 1421442744.
- Weeraratna, Ashani T.; Jiang, Yuan; Hostetter, Galen; Rosenblatt, Kevin; Duray, Paul; Bittner, Michael; Trent, Jeffrey M. (2002). "Wnt5a signaling directly affects cell motility and invasion of metastatic melanoma". Cancer Cell. 1 (3): 279–288. doi:10.1016/S1535-6108(02)00045-4. PMID 12086864.
- Weeraratna, Ashani T. (2005). "A Wnt-er Wonderland—The complexity of Wnt signaling in melanoma". Cancer and Metastasis Reviews. 24 (2): 237–250. doi:10.1007/s10555-005-1574-z. PMID 15986134. S2CID 21999747.
