= Paul Lieberman =

American researcher

Paul M. Lieberman is an American biomedical researcher and chairperson of the Gene Expression and Regulation Program at the Ellen and Ronald Caplan Cancer Center at The Wistar Institute in Philadelphia. He is also the Hilary Koprowski, M.D., endowed professor, the McNeil professor of Molecular Medicine and Translational Research, and the founding director for the Center for Chemical Biology and Translational Medicine at The Wistar Institute. Lieberman's research focuses on how viruses cause cancer and autoimmune disease, particularly the Epstein–Barr virus.

== Education ==
He earned a BA in chemistry from Cornell University (1983) and a Ph.D. in molecular virology from Johns Hopkins School of Medicine (1989).

== Career and research ==
Lieberman and his laboratory have facilitated the development of the first annotated atlas of the Epstein-Barr virus epigenome. In 2011, Lieberman received a Seeding Drug Discovery Award from Wellcome Trust for $4.7 million to develop a drug against Epstein-Barr virus-related cancers. This was the first project to receive such an award from the United Kingdom-based trust. He also leads a team developing a drug to treat Epstein-Barr virus-related cancers. This project received a United Kingdom-based Wellcome Trust Seeding Drug Discovery.

Lieberman previously served as the president of the International Association for Research on Epstein-Barr Virus and Associated Diseases and is an elected fellow of the American Association for the Advancement of Sciences (AAAS).

== Select publications ==
- Dheekollu J, Wiedmer A, Ayyanathan K, Deakyne JS, Messick TE, Lieberman PM (February 2021). "Cell-cycle-dependent EBNA1-DNA crosslinking promotes replication termination at oriP and viral episome maintenance". Cell. 184 (3): 643–654.e13. doi:10.1016/j.cell.2020.12.022. PMC 8186250. PMID 33482082.
- Soldan SS, Su C, Lamontagne RJ, Grams N, Lu F, Zhang Y, Gesualdi JD, Frase DM, Tolvinski LE, Martin K, Messick TE, Fingerut JT, Koltsova E, Kossenkov A, Lieberman PM (June 2021). "Epigenetic Plasticity Enables CNS-Trafficking of EBV-infected B Lymphocytes". PLOS Pathogens. 17 (6) e1009618. doi:10.1371/journal.ppat.1009618. PMC 8216538. PMID 34106998.
- Lamontagne RJ, Soldan SS, Su C, Wiedmer A, Won KJ, Lu F, Goldman AR, Wickramasinghe J, Tang HY, Speicher DW, Showe L, Kossenkov AV, Lieberman PM (January 2021). "A multi-omics approach to Epstein-Barr virus immortalization of B-cells reveals EBNA1 chromatin pioneering activities targeting nucleotide metabolism". PLOS Pathogens. 17 (1) e1009208. doi:10.1371/journal.ppat.1009208. PMC 7864721. PMID 33497421.
- Mei Y, Messick TE, Dheekollu J, Kim HJ, Molugu S, Muñoz LJ, Moiskeenkova-Bell V, Murakami K, Lieberman PM (September 2022). "Cryo-EM Structure and Functional Studies of EBNA1 Binding to the Family of Repeats and Dyad Symmetry Elements of Epstein-Barr Virus oriP". Journal of Virology. 96 (17): e0094922. doi:10.1128/jvi.00949-22. PMC 9472633. PMID 36037477.
- Gulve N, Su C, Deng Z, Soldan SS, Vladimirova O, Wickramasinghe J, Zheng H, Kossenkov AV, Lieberman PM (August 2022). "DAXX-ATRX regulation of p53 chromatin binding and DNA damage response". Nature Communications. 13 (1): 5033. Bibcode:2022NatCo..13.5033G. doi:10.1038/s41467-022-32680-8. PMC 9418176. PMID 36028493.
- Deng Z, Glousker G, et al., Lieberman PM, Tzfati, Y. Inherited mutations in the helicase RTEL1 cause telomere dysfunction and Hoyeraal-Hreidarsson syndrome. PNAS 2013.
- Dheekollu J, Chen HS, Kaye KM, Lieberman PM. Timeless-dependent DNA replication-coupled recombination promotes Kaposi's Sarcoma-associated herpesvirus episome maintenance and terminal repeat stability. Journal of Virology. 2013 Apr 87(7):369.
- Deng Z, Wang Z, Stong N, Plasschaert R, et al. Riethman H, and Lieberman PM. A role for CTCF and cohesion in subtelomere chromatin organization, TERRA transcription, and telomere end protection. EMBO J. 2012 Nov 31(21):4165.
- Kang H, Cho H, Sung GH, Lieberman PM. CTCF regulates Kaposi's sarcoma-associated herpesvirus latency transcription by nucleosome displacement and RNA polymerase programming. Journal of Virology 2013 Feb 87(3)1789.
- Arvey A, Tempera I, Tsai K, Chen HS, Tikhmyanova N, Klichinsky M, Leslie C, Lieberman PM. An atlas of the Epstein-Barr virus transcriptome and epigenome reveals host-virus regulatory interactions. Cell Host Microbe 2012 Aug 12(2)233.
