= Krichevsky =

Surname list

Krichevsky Krithcevsky, or Krychevsky (Russian: Кричевский, Ukrainian: Кричевський) is a Russian and Ukrainian surname. Feminine forms include Krichevskaya and Krychevska.

The surname may refer to:

- David Kritchevsky (1920–2006), American biochemist of Ukrainian-Jewish descent
- Fedir Krychevsky (1879–1947), Ukrainian early modernist painter, brother of graphic designer Vasyl Krychevsky
- Mikhail Krichevsky (1897–2008), Ukraine's last surviving World War I veteran
- Mykhailo Krychevsky or Stanisław Krzyczewski or Krzeczowski (died 3 August 1649), Polish noble, military officer and Cossack commander
- Vasyl Krychevsky (1873–1952), Ukrainian painter, architect, art scholar, graphic artist, and master of applied art and decorative art, brother of Ukrainian painter Fedir Krychevsky

== See also ==
- Jan Kryjevski (born 1948), Russian painter
