= Louise Showe =

Louise C. Showe is an American biomedical researcher who was scientific director of the Genomics Facility and the Bioinformatics Facility at The Wistar Institute in Philadelphia. Her research focused on functional genomics and how they can be used to better understand the immune system and cancer. She retired in 2024.

Showe has said that being able to "globally screen gene expression patterns using genomics and proteomics appears to have injected a new level of enthusiasm for learning what is going on in complex cancers that have been particularly recalcitrant to therapy." Recently, Showe's research led to the creation of a blood test that could be used to test for lung cancer using a 29-gene assay. The company OncoCyte has partnered with Wistar to develop lung cancer diagnostic tests.
