= Plotkin's Vaccines =

Medical textbook

- 8th edition cover
- Author: Stanley Plotkin, Paul Offit, Walter Orenstein, and Kathryn M. Edwards
- Language: English
- Publisher: W. B. Saunders Company (1st–6th editions), Elsevier
- Publication date: 1988, 1994, 1999, 2004, 2008, 2012, 2017, 2023
- Publication place: United States

Plotkin's Vaccines (also known as Plotkin on Vaccines; or just Vaccines) is a comprehensive medical textbook on vaccines first published by American virologist Stanley Plotkin in 1988, that edition being co-authored by pediatrician and epidemiologist Edward A. Mortimer Jr., with subsequent editions produced every several years leading to the eighth edition in 2023. The seventh and eighth editions were co-authored by Plotkin, Paul Offit, Walter Orenstein, and Kathryn M. Edwards. The book is generally considered to be the standard reference in the field of vaccinology.

== History ==
In the 1960s, Stanley Plotkin played a pivotal role in vaccine development, including the development of a vaccine against rubella virus, while working at Wistar Institute in Philadelphia. Plotkin was a member of Wistar's active research faculty from 1960 to 1991. In the 1980s, Plotkin had the idea to write a text focused on vaccines, explaining in an interview decades later:

I felt that there was now a field of study that was not infectious diseases. It derived from infectious diseases, but it was no longer classical infectious diseases. It was not really immunology, although immunology is of course the basis of vaccines. Vaccinology was now a field itself, and did not have a textbook. I felt that it was time to show that, indeed, it is a separate field and that it needed a source of information where you could find answers to questions about vaccines.

The initial volume, published in 1988 under the W.B. Saunders Company imprint, was 633 pages, and represented the work of 42 experts in the field, led by Plotkin and Case Western Reserve University professor of pediatric medicine Edward A. Mortimer Jr. The British Medical Journal (BMJ), while generally praising the scope of the book and the extent of its references, critically noted that "of the 43 contributors, all but four are American", also noting that the focus of the book was on products licensed in the United States, and that the sources were also "predominantly American".

Each subsequent edition has tended to add several hundred pages of new material, as well as additional contributing authors. A review of the third edition in the journal Shock, for example, described it as "considerably enlarged with important new additions", and noted its suitability for a broad audience, including students, practitioners, and infectious disease experts. The Journal of the American Medical Association (JAMA) noted that the third edition contained contributions from 96 experts from around the world, including local experts on certain regional vaccine-preventable diseases like Japanese encephalitis and yellow fever. JAMA noted critically that "there is no CD-ROM version", a feature addressed through the addition of electronic counterparts for later volumes.

Walter Orenstein became a co-author beginning with the third edition in 1999, and Paul Offit joined Plotkin and Orenstein as a co-author beginning with the fifth edition in 2008. After the publication of the sixth edition, the Saunders imprint was acquired by Elsevier, which was the publisher for subsequent editions. Kathryn M. Edwards became the fourth co-author beginning with the seventh edition in 2017. The seventh edition was also the first to be designated on the cover as Plotkin's Vaccines, rather than just Vaccines.

== Structure ==
Recent editions have generally been organized into five sections:

1. General Aspects of Vaccination, which covers foundational topics such as the history of vaccines, immunology, correlates of protection, and passive immunization.
2. Licensed Vaccines and Vaccines in Development, which includes disease-specific chapters on viral, bacterial, and parasitic vaccines, as well as vaccines for cancer and non-infectious diseases such as Parkinson's and diabetes.
3. New Technologies, which explores genetic-based vaccine platforms, structural vaccinology, and related innovations.
4. Vaccination of Special Groups, with chapters specifically on immunization for pregnant women, immunocompromised individuals, travelers, and healthcare workers.
5. Public Health and Regulatory Issues, which discusses vaccination policy variations across regions, including the United States, Europe, Asia-Pacific, and low- and middle-income countries.

The disease-specific chapters typically discuss the history of the disease, available and developing vaccines, immune response, clinical applications, and outcomes in various populations. Recent editions of the book have been accompanied by digital eBook editions offering updates on recent topics such as mpox, and includes illustrations, supplementary tools, and access to mobile applications and web resources.

== Reception ==
The History of Vaccines project of the College of Physicians of Philadelphia states that Vaccines is "considered the best textbook in vaccinology". The seventh edition won the 2018 BMA Medical Book Awards prize in the category of Public Health. A review of the eighth edition in the journal Travel Medicine and Infectious Disease stated that "Plotkin's Vaccines book has been for many years the key reference text globally in the field", and described it as "a comprehensive resource covering various aspects of vaccines and immunization, including the latest evidence, recommendations, protocols (pipelines), and developments in vaccine research". The review noted that the work was endorsed by Bill Gates, who described it in his Foreword for the Sixth Edition as "an indispensable guide to the enhancement of the well-being of our world".

In December 2020, Kentucky columnist Al Cross suggested that a copy of the book would be an ideal Christmas gift for Senator Rand Paul, "so he can bone up on science that he seems to have missed in medical school".

== Edition history ==
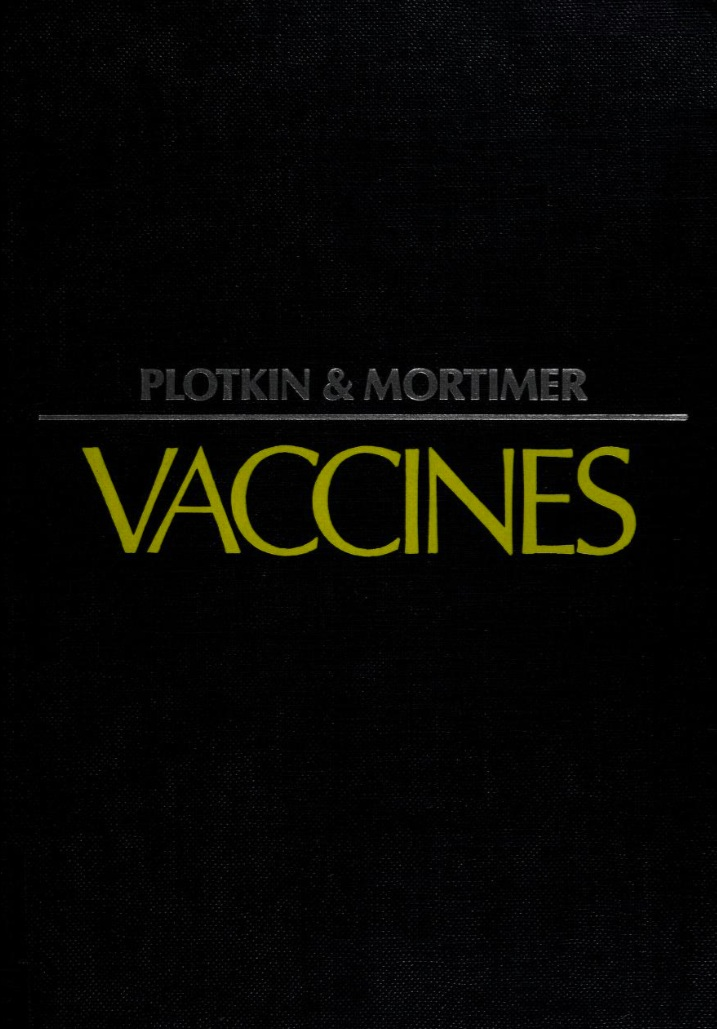
Cover of the first edition published in 1988

- Vaccines (by Stanley A. Plotkin MD and Edward A. Mortimer MD), 633 pages, published January 1, 1988
- Vaccines, 2nd edition (by Stanley A. Plotkin MD and Edward A. Mortimer MD), 1,016 pages, published January 1, 1994
- Vaccines, 3rd edition (by Stanley A. Plotkin MD and Walter A. Orenstein MD DSc), 1,230 pages, published October 1, 1999
- Vaccines, 4th edition (by Stanley A. Plotkin MD and Walter A. Orenstein MD DSc), 1,408 pages, published January 21, 2004
- Vaccines, 5th edition (by Stanley A. Plotkin MD, Walter A. Orenstein MD DSc, and Paul Offit MD), 1,748 pages, published February 21, 2008
- Vaccines, 6th edition (by Stanley A. Plotkin MD, Walter A. Orenstein MD DSc, and Paul Offit MD), 1,570 pages, published October 30, 2012
- Vaccines, 7th edition (by Stanley A. Plotkin MD, Walter A. Orenstein MD DSc, Paul Offit MD, and Kathryn M. Edwards MD), 1,720 pages, published June 20, 2017
- Vaccines, 8th edition (by Stanley A. Plotkin MD, Walter A. Orenstein MD DSc, Paul Offit MD, and Kathryn M. Edwards MD), 1,808 pages, published April 3, 2023
