= Edward A. Mortimer Jr. =

Edward A. Mortimer Jr. (March 22, 1922 – July 20, 2002) was an American pediatrician, epidemiologist, and public health educator, known for his contributions to infectious disease research, vaccine advocacy, and public health policy. Over a career spanning five decades, he held faculty positions at several medical institutions and identified and addressed pediatric health risks.

== Early life, education, and military service ==
Born in Chicago, Mortimer graduated from Dartmouth College in 1943, and subsequently received a Bachelor of Medicine from Northwestern University in 1946, and a Doctor of Medicine from the same institution in 1947. He served in the United States Navy in the late 1940s before beginning his clinical medical training at St. Luke's Hospital in Chicago and the Boston Children's Hospital. He later served as a teaching fellow in pediatrics at Harvard University.

== Career ==
In 1952, Mortimer joined the faculty of the Case Western Reserve University School of Medicine in Cleveland, Ohio, having been recruited by Frederick C. Robbins to help build the pediatrics department. Mortimer remained at Case Western for 14 years before becoming the founding chairman of the pediatrics department at the University of New Mexico School of Medicine in Albuquerque in 1966. During his tenure at UNM, he advocated for fluoridation of public water supplies, which drew both support and criticism.

Mortimer returned to Case Western Reserve in 1975 to chair the department of epidemiology and community health. He held that position until his retirement in 1992, and remained active in research for nearly a decade afterward.

In the 1960s, he was one of the first physicians to trace the spread of hospital-acquired Staphylococcus infections to the unclean hands of medical personnel. He also helped develop treatments for pediatric ear infections and led a school-based throat culture program aimed at detecting and preventing rheumatic fever.

In the 1980s, Mortimer chaired an American Academy of Pediatrics committee that helped establish the link between the administration of aspirin to children and Reye syndrome. He advocated for mandatory warning labels on children's aspirin, which was resisted by pharmaceutical manufacturers. He also spoke out in favor of the diphtheria, tetanus, and pertussis (DTP) vaccine during public debates over its safety. In 1988, he collaborated with Stanley Plotkin, inventor of the rubella vaccine, in publishing the first edition of Plotkin's Vaccines.

In 1993, a symposium and dinner were held in Cleveland to honor his 46 years of service in medicine, education, and public policy.

== Personal life and death ==
On December 22, 1944, Mortimer married Joan Rothwell of Great Neck, New York, with whom he had three children. He died at his home in Cleveland at the age of 80, from complications related to amyotrophic lateral sclerosis (ALS).
