= Hilary Koprowski Prize in Neurovirology =

US medical science award

The Hilary Koprowski Prize in Neurovirology was established in 2014 by Drexel University in honor of Dr. Hilary Koprowski's contributions to the field of neurovirology. The prize is awarded annually in conjunction with the International Symposium on Molecular Medicine and Infectious Disease, which is sponsored by the Institute for Molecular Medicine and Infectious Disease (IMMID) within the Drexel University College of Medicine. During the Symposium, the prize recipient is asked to deliver an honorary lecture.

== See also ==
- List of medicine awards
