= Ingrid Allen =

Northern Irish neuropathologist (1932–2020)

Dame Ingrid Victoria Allen DBE FMedSci
- Born: 30 June 1932; Belfast
- Died: 21 April 2020 (aged 87)
- Education: Queen's University Belfast
- Known for: Research into neurodegeneration; Research into multiple sclerosis
- Awards: CBE (1993); FMedSci (1998); DBE (2001)
- Scientific career
- Fields: Medicine; Neurovirology
- Workplaces: Queen's University Belfast; Royal Victoria Hospital, Belfast
- Website: Official website

Dame Ingrid Victoria Allen DBE FMedSci (30 June 1932 – 21 April 2020) was a Northern Irish neuropathologist. She was a Professor Emerita of Neuropathology at Queen's University Belfast. She is mostly known for her research in pathology, neurodegeneration, neurovirology and demyelinating diseases, such as multiple sclerosis.

== Education and early life ==
Allen was born in Belfast in 1932. Her parents were the Reverend Robert Allen and Doris Allen. She attended Ashley Prep Belfast and Cheltenham Ladies College before going on to study medicine at Queen's University Belfast, graduating in 1957.

== Career and research ==
Allen established the Regional Neuropathology Service for Northern Ireland in 1972, becoming its first leader. This provided biopsies and autopsies for conditions such as brain tumours, head injuries, brain infections, multiple sclerosis and Alzheimer's disease. She has published over 200 papers, spanning over 60 years. Her work is focused chiefly on multiple sclerosis, viral infections of the nervous system and penetrating head injury. Her research achievements include discovering markers for multiple sclerosis at the cellular and molecular level, research into the role of viruses in multiple sclerosis, the observation that measles virus spreads transneuronally and probably transsynaptically within the nervous system and research into the cellular level response to penetrating head injury.

Allen was Vice President of the Royal College of Pathologists from 1993 to 1996, and in 1997 was appointed the first Director for Research and Development for Health and Personal Social Services in Northern Ireland. In this role, she was responsible for developing the research strategy “Research for Health and Wellbeing”, published in 1999. She held this role until 2002. She has also served on the Medical Research Council and on the Joint Medical Advisory Committee of the Higher Education Funding Council for England.

== Awards and honours ==
Allen was elected to the Royal Irish Academy in 1993 and elected as one of the founding Fellows of Academy of Medical Sciences in 1998.

She was granted an honorary doctorate in Medical Sciences from her alma mater Queen's University Belfast in 2003 before being granted both a CBE in 1993 followed by a DBE in 2001, both for Medical Research.

Queen's University Belfast honoured Allen in 2008 with a portrait which hangs in the university's Great Hall - at the time only the third female academic from Queen's to be recognised in this way.

== Personal life ==
Allen was an elder in the McCracken Memorial Presbyterian Church in Belfast. She was a member of Christians in Science, the Society of Ordained Scientists and the Thomas Merton Society of Great Britain and Ireland.
