= Hildegund C. J. Ertl =

Vaccine researcher

Hildegund C. J. Ertl is a researcher who works at The Wistar Institute in Philadelphia.

== Career ==
Ertl's research into vaccine has taken a different approach from conventional wisdom, combining parts of different viruses that pose no harm to humans but still stimulate an immune response.

In 2007, Ertl helped create The Wistar Institute Vaccine Center. Ertl said that the vaccines the laboratories in the center are developing "have important implications for public health because they can reduce disease and death from very common infections. Additionally, she said that she wants to make existing vaccines more accessible in developing areas such as Africa and Asia.

In interviews, Ertl has been cautious and critical when it comes to the development of vaccines for AIDS. Her research has shown that the vaccine may exhaust key cells of the immune system that are needed to fight the virus.
