= Amy Louise Daniels =

American scientist (1875–1965)

- Born: July 26, 1875; Massachusetts, U.S.
- Died: January 31, 1965 (aged 89)
- Education: Yale University
- Scientific career
- Thesis: Fat-transport and Metabolism, Studied with the Aid of Fat-soluble Dyes (1912)

Amy Louise Daniels (July 26, 1875 – January 31, 1965) was an American nutrition researcher at the University of Iowa who was known for her work on nutrition and health, primarily in children.

== Education and career ==
Daniels was born in Massachusetts on July 26, 1875. She received her bachelor's degree at Columbia University in 1906. In 1912 she received as the first woman a PhD from Yale in biochemistry. Daniels also studied at Massachusetts Institute of Technology and Harvard University.

Daniels was an assistant professor at the University of Missouri from 1911 to 1914. In 1914 she moved to the University of Wisconsin and founded the Home Economics Department. She remained there until 1918 when she moved to the University of Iowa where she would retire as full professor in 1941; she worked primarily at the Iowa Child Welfare Research Station.

In 1930 Daniels served as a member of the White House Conference on Child Development. She was an early member of the American Home Economics Association and the American Institute of Nutrition. In addition to her own research, Daniels encouraged one of her colleagues, Harry Steenbock, to publish his results on vitamin D so he did not get scooped by someone else. Daniels died on January 31, 1965, at age 89.

== Research ==
Daniels is known for her research on nutrition and health, primarily in children. She led research on study of nutritional needs of babies, and once helped a person in India who sent her buffalo milk with the goal of making it an appropriate food for infants. Her work in this area determined that cow's milk did not provide enough nutrients required by children. She also discussed the need for exercise by children and an appropriate diet, which included suggestions to limit meat consumption. Daniels was interested in the type of soap needed to adequately wash clothes, and linked susceptibility to colds with an insufficient amount of milk or butter in the diet that can lead to a lack vitamin A.

Daniels used rats as model organisms in her research, and in 1940 she collaborated with William E. Castle and Helen Dean King to work with wobbly rats, a variant so called because of their uneven movements.

== Honors and awards ==
- In 1937 Daniels received the first Borden Award from the American Home Economics Association for her research paper, "Relation of Ingestion of Milk to Calcium Metabolism in Children". The award was given for "meritorious research on milk and milk products".
- In 1959 Daniels was named to the first edition of the Who's Who of American Women.
- During 1966 Thirtieth Annual Meeting of the American Institute of Nutrition, a resolution highlighting her career was read in her honor.

== Selected publications ==
- Daniels, Amy L.; Rich, Jean K. (1918). "The Role of Inorganic Sulfates in Nutrition". Journal of Biological Chemistry. 36 (1): 27–32. doi:10.1016/S0021-9258(18)86416-X.
- Daniels, Amy Louise (1914). The influence of lithum and atophan on the uric acid excretion of a gouty patient. Chicago: American Medical Association. OCLC 20327508.
- Daniels, Amy Louise; Byfield, Albert H.; Loughlin, Rosemary (1921). Investigations in the artificial feeding of children. Iowa City: Univ. OCLC 250407715.
- Daniels, A. L.; White, R. B. (May 1, 1930). "Influence on Development of Suckling Young of Addition of Certain Amino Acids to Diet of Mother During Lactation". Experimental Biology and Medicine. 27 (8): 761–762. doi:10.3181/00379727-27-4956. ISSN 1535-3702.
- Daniels, Amy Louise; Byfield, Albert Henry; Marsh, Rosemary Laughlin (1969). Investigations in the artificial feeding of children. New York: Kraus Reprint Corp. OCLC 4334785.
