= Hilary Koprowski =

Polish virologist and immunologist (1916–2013)

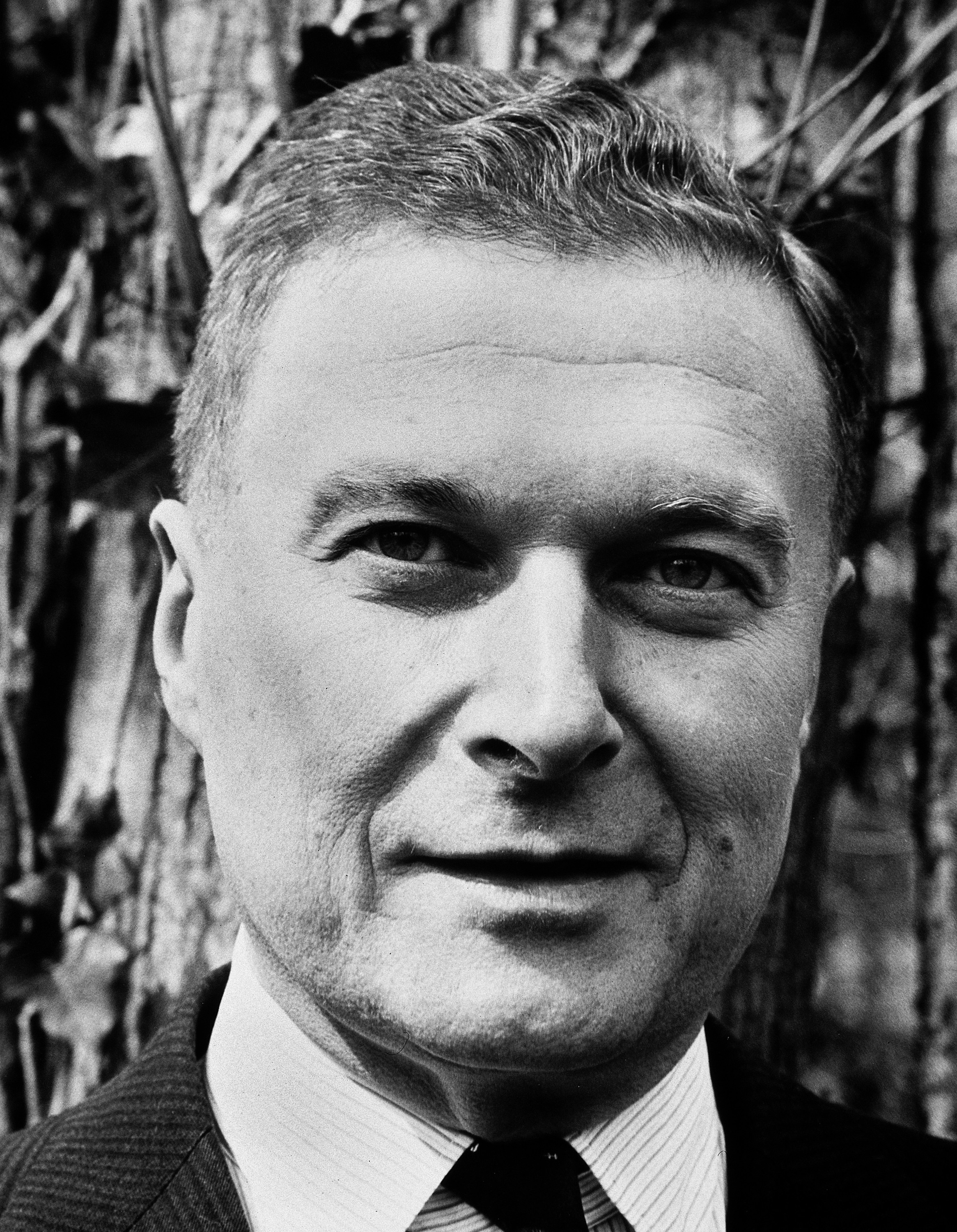
- Born: 5 December 1916; Warsaw, Government General of Warsaw
- Died: 11 April 2013 (aged 96); Wynnewood, Pennsylvania, U.S.
- Burial place: West Laurel Hill Cemetery, Bala Cynwyd, Pennsylvania, U.S.
- Citizenship: Poland; United States
- Known for: First scientist to attenuate poliovirus and conduct large-scale human trials of Polio vaccine *Improved rabies vaccine *Director of Wistar Institute (1957-1991) *Co-founder of Centocor
- Spouse: Irena Koprowska (m. 1938)
- Children: 2
- Awards: The Philadelphia Award (1989), Albert B. Sabin Gold Medal (2007), John Scott Medal, Legion of Honour
- Scientific career
- Fields: Virology

Hilary Koprowski (5 December 1916 – 11 April 2013) was a Polish virologist and immunologist. He was the first scientist to produce attenuated poliovirus and to conduct large-scale clinical research studies of an oral polio vaccine. His vaccine was used to immunize millions of children during trials in the Belgian Congo and Poland. He was the director of the Wistar Institute of Anatomy and Biology from 1957 to 1991 where he developed an improved rabies vaccine and pioneered the usage of monoclonal antibodies for cancer diagnosis and treatment. He was a professor of microbiology and immunology at the University of Pennsylvania and director of the Center of Neurovirology and Biotechnology Foundation Laboratories at Thomas Jefferson University. He co-founded the biotechnology firm Centocor in 1979.

He was accused in the oral polio vaccine AIDS hypothesis that HIV/AIDS originated from his oral polio vaccine studied in the Belgian Congo. This hypothesis was challenged and scientists have largely rejected it.

He received the Philadelphia Award in 1989; the Albert B. Sabin Gold Medal for his work in biomedical research in 2007; the John Scott Medal; and the Legion of Honour. Drexel University College of Medicine established the Hilary Koprowski Prize in Neurovirology in his honor. In 2018, Poland posthumously conferred the Order of the White Eagle upon Koprowski.

== Early life and education ==
Koprowski was born December 5, 1916, in Warsaw, Poland. His father was a textile manufacturer and his mother was a dentist.

He began playing piano at age 5. He graduated from Mikolaj Rej High School and received a degree in piano from the Warsaw Conservatory. He was a polymath and spoke several languages as a teenager. He worked one summer in a laboratory in Dublin, Ireland, which sparked his interest in science. He attended the University of Warsaw Medical School and graduated in 1939.

In 1939, after the invasion of Poland, Koprowski and his pregnant wife, fled the country, using Koprowski family business connections in Manchester, England. Hilary went to Rome and studied piano at the Santa Cecilia Conservatory. His wife completed her medical residency in France and they were reunited in Portugal before moving to Brazil.

On June 3, 1983, Koprowski received an honorary doctorate from the Faculty of Medicine at Uppsala University, Sweden.

== Career ==
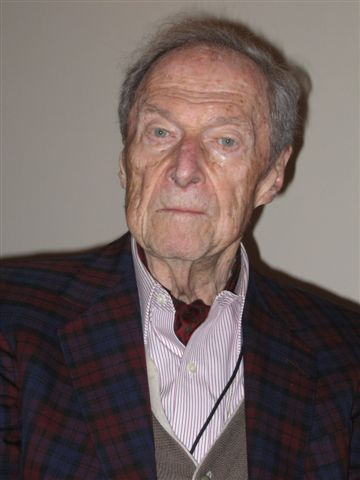
Koprowski in 2007

Koprowski worked with Edwin Herman Lennette and Max Theiler in Rio de Janeiro for the Rockefeller Foundation laboratories as a research assistant. He researched the pathogenesis of the Venezuelan equine encephalitis virus and monitored yellow fever vaccine trials. He impressed the senior staff and a position was found for him at Lederle Laboratories in Pearl River, New York.

At Lederle, Koprowski built on the work of Max Theiler and his yellow fever vaccine and applied the attenuation process to poliovirus. He published a paper on the development of the first attenuated polio vaccine in 1952, a few years before Jonas Salk and Albert Sabin. Koprowski's work on an attenuated vaccine laid the groundwork for the eventual success that Albert Sabin had with his oral polio vaccine. Sabin used attenuated polio virus obtained from Koprowski for some of the early work on his oral polio vaccine.

Koprowski developed his polio vaccine by attenuating the virus in brain cells of the cotton rat, Sigmodon hispidus, a species that is susceptible to polio. He administered the vaccine to himself in January 1948 and on 20 children at Letchworth Village, a home for disabled persons. Seventeen of the 20 children developed antibodies to polio virus — the other three apparently already had antibodies — and none of the children developed polio.

Koprowski viewed the live vaccine as more powerful, since it entered the intestinal tract directly and could provide lifelong immunity, whereas the Salk vaccine required booster shots. Also, administering a vaccine by mouth is easy, whereas an injection requires medical facilities and is more expensive.

In the mid-1950s, Koprowski and Albert Sabin worked separately to attenuate polioviruses in monkey kidney cells. They were both successful but Koprowski was the first to conduct large-scale clinical research studies on his polio vaccine. In 1958, the Koprowski vaccine was used to immunize 250,000 children in Belgian Congo in 6 weeks. In 1959 and 1960, the Koprowski vaccine was used to immunize nine million children in Poland and halted a polio outbreak there. However, the Sabin vaccine proved less neurovirulent in monkeys and successful testing in the Soviet Union allowed his vaccine to achieve approval in the United States and by the World Health Organization for use globally.

British journalist Edward Hooper publicized a hypothesis that Koprowski's research into a polio vaccine in the Belgian Congo in the late 1950s might have caused HIV/AIDS. This hypothesis has been rejected by the medical community and is contradicted by at least one article in the journal Nature, which claims the HIV-1 group M virus originated in Africa 30 years before the OPV trials were conducted. The journal Science refuted Hooper's claims, writing: "[I]t can be stated with almost complete certainty that the large polio vaccine trial... was not the origin of AIDS."

Koprowski rejected the claim, based on his own analysis. In a separate court case, he won a regretful clarification, and a symbolic award of $1 in damages, in a defamation suit against Rolling Stone, which had published an article repeating similar false allegations. Rolling Stone published an apology. A concurrent defamation lawsuit that Koprowski brought against the Associated Press was settled several years later; the settlement's terms were not publicly disclosed.

In 1957, Norman Topping, the vice president of medical affairs at the University of Pennsylvania, offered Koprowski the position of director of the Wistar Institute. The institute had fallen into irrelevance and Koprowski revived it into a world class biomedical research center. He continued his polio vaccine research at the Wistar Institute and studied the fusion of somatic cells and eggs, subacute sclerosing panencephalitis, and other viruses that affect the central nervous system. He was a pioneer in the usage of monoclonal antibodies in cancer diagnosis and treatment including cancer immunotherapy and developed functional monoclonal antibodies targeted against antigens for colorectal cancer and pancreatic cancer.

Along with Stanley Plotkin and Tadeusz Wiktor, Koprowski worked on an improved vaccine against rabies. The group developed the HDCV rabies vaccine in the 1960s at the Wistar Institute. The improved vaccine had less injections, good efficacy, and fewer side effects. It was licensed for use in the United States in 1980. The Wistar Institute also developed a rubella vaccine and a rotavirus vaccine while Koprowski led the organization. He co-founded the biotechnology firm Centocor in 1979. He was dismissed from the Wistar Institute in 1991. He sued the board of trustees of the institute for age and personal discrimination and the board sued him for profiting from scientific discoveries made at the institute through his co-founding of Centocor.

He was a professor of microbiology and immunology and the University of Pennsylvania and Director of the Center for Neurovirology and Biotechnology Foundation Laboratories at Thomas Jefferson University.

He published over 900 scientific articles on over 25 different viruses including flaviviruses, herpes simplex virus, parainfluenza virus type 1, polio, rabies, and simian virus 40. Koprowski was a member of the National Academy of Sciences, the American Academy of Arts and Sciences, the New York Academy of Sciences, and the Polish Institute of Arts and Sciences of America.

Koprowski died on April 11, 2013, aged 96, in Wynnewood, Pennsylvania, of pneumonia. He was interred at West Laurel Hill Cemetery in Bala Cynwyd, Pennsylvania.

== Honors and legacy ==
Koprowski received the John Scott Medal and on 13 March 1997, he received the French Legion of Honour. He received the 1989 Philadelphia Award for his research achievements at the Wistar Institute. He was a Fellow of the College of Physicians of Philadelphia, which in 1959 presented him with its Alvarenga Prize.

Historical marker in front of the Wistar Institute in Philadelphia commemorates Koprowski's achievements

On 1 May 2007, Koprowski was awarded the Albert Sabin Gold Medal by the Sabin Vaccine Institute for his work in biomedical research. The Kosciuszko Foundation led an initiative to place a historical marker near the Wistar Institute in recognition of Koprowski's achievements.

Drexel University College of Medicine established the Hilary Koprowski Prize in Neurovirology in honor of Dr. Koprowski's contributions to the field of neurovirology.

In 2018, at a ceremony held at the Royal Castle in Warsaw on the 100th anniversary of Poland regaining its independence, Polish President Andrzej Duda posthumously conferred the country's highest distinction, the Order of the White Eagle, upon 25 distinguished Poles including Koprowski.

== Personal life ==
He met Irena Koprowska while studying at University of Warsaw Medical School. They were married in secret in 1938, and together had two sons.

== See also ==
- List of Polish people
