= H. Fred Clark =

American veterinarian

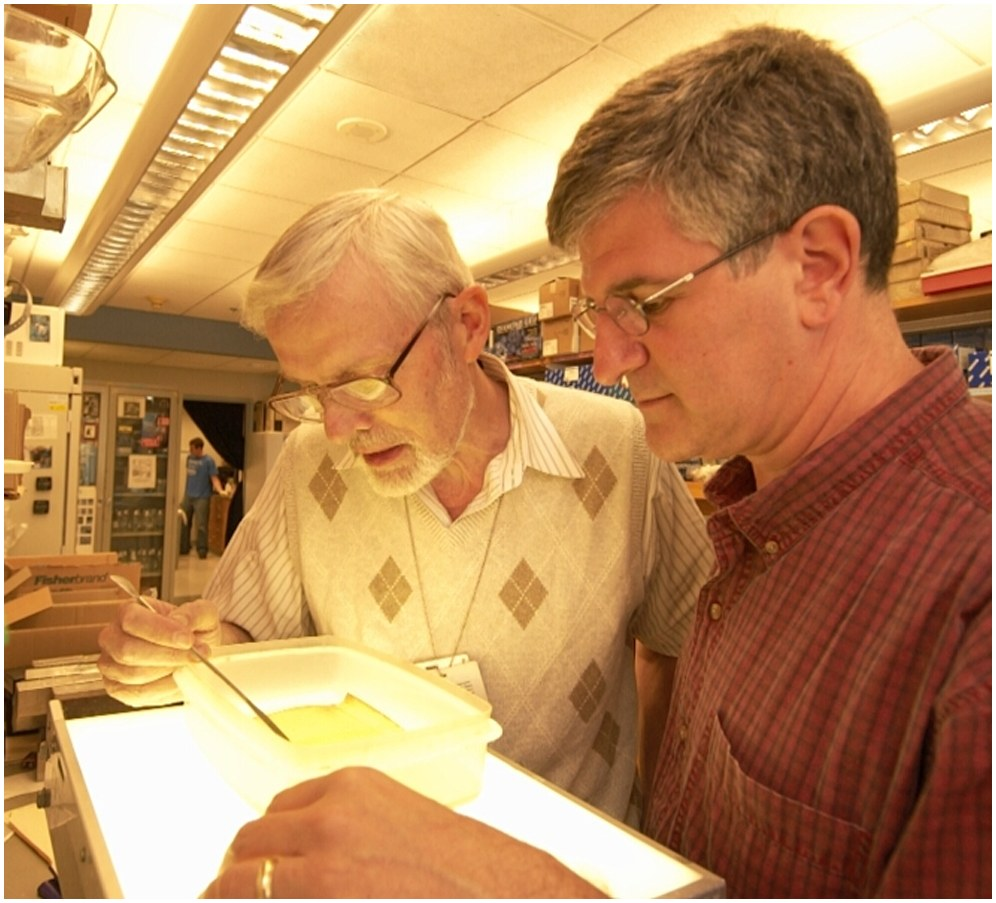
- Clark (left) with Paul Offit (right)
- Born: 1937
- Died: April 28, 2012 (aged 74–75)
- Education: Cornell University; University at Buffalo
- Known for: Rotavirus vaccine
- Spouses: Mimi Rice; Karen Clark
- Children: Christopher, Melanie, Marianne, step children Elisabeth, Peter, Alexandra
- Awards: (with Paul Offit Stanley Plotkin) Children's Hospital of Philadelphia Gold Medal (2006)
- Scientific career
- Fields: Medicine
- Institutions: Children's Hospital of Philadelphia; Perelman School of Medicine at the University of Pennsylvania; Wistar Institute
- Thesis: The suckling mouse cataract agent (SMCA) in mice: Studies on viral growth in eyes and viscera and the immune response (1967)

H. Fred Clark (1937 – April 28, 2012) was an American veterinarian, medical scientist, and social activist. He served as a research professor of pediatrics at the University of Pennsylvania's Perelman School of Medicine and at the Children's Hospital of Philadelphia, as well as holding the position of adjunct professor at the Wistar Institute. He is recognized for his work with Paul Offit and Stanley Plotkin developing the rotavirus vaccine RotaTeq. For this work, Clark, Offit, and Plotkin received the Children's Hospital of Philadelphia's Gold Medal in 2006. He received a degree in veterinary medicine from Cornell University and a Ph.D. in microbiology and immunology from the University at Buffalo.
