= Irena Koprowska =

Polish pathologist (1917-2012)

- Born: 12 May 1917; Warsaw, Kingdom of Poland
- Died: 16 August 2012 (aged 95); Wynnewood, Pennsylvania, U.S.
- Citizenship: Poland, United States
- Known for: Leader in the field of Cytopathology
- Spouse: Hilary Koprowski (m. 1938; 2 children)
- Awards: Papanikolaou Award(1985)
- Scientific career
- Fields: Cytopathology

Irena Koprowska, née Grasberg (May 12, 1917 - August 16, 2012) was a Polish pathologist and a leader in the field of cytopathology. She co-authored with Dr. Georgios Papanikolaou the earliest case report of lung cancer identified from a sputum smear.

She was the first woman to be named a full professor at Hahnemann Medical College and worked as the director of the School of Cytotechnology. She was director of the cytology lab at Temple University Hospital and professor of pathology at Temple University Medical School from 1970 to 1987. She received the Papanicolaou Award from the American Society of Cytopathology in 1985.

== Early life and education ==
She was born Irena Grasberg May 12, 1917, in Warsaw, Poland, to Eugenia and Henryk Grasberg. She was educated by private tutors and began taking classes at the Popielewska Roszkowska Gymnasium in 1926.

She met Hilary Koprowski while studying at University of Warsaw Medical School and they were married in secret in 1938. They both graduated from medical school, in 1939. She and her husband fled Poland during her pregnancy due to the invasion of Poland. She lived in Rome, Italy, for a short time with her in-laws, and then moved to Paris, France. In 1940, she completed her medical internship at Villejuif Lunatic Asylum in Seine, France.

== Career ==
They moved to Rio de Janeiro, Brazil, when her husband found work there. From 1942 to 1944, she worked as an assistant pathologist at the City Hospital Miguel Cuoto. She conducted over 400 autopsies and reported her findings in Latin to a translator as she was not fluent in the Portuguese language spoken in Brazil. In 1944, she moved with her husband to New York City to help further his research career.

She worked as a volunteer assistant in the pathology department of Cornell Medical Center. She obtained her pathology credentials and eventually worked in a paid position. She worked as a research fellow to Georgios Papanikolaou and he became her mentor. She became a well respected researcher focused on early detection of cancer of the cervix, lung, and uterus. Koprowska and Papanikolaou co-authored the earliest case report of lung cancer identified from a sputum smear.

In 1957, she moved with her family to Philadelphia. She was the first woman to be made a full professor at Hahnemann Medical College in 1964 and worked as the director of the School of Cytotechnology. She was director of the cytology lab at Temple University Hospital and professor of pathology at Temple University Medical School from 1970 to 1987.

Koprowska was a founding member of the Inter Society Council of Cytology, which became the American Society of Cytopathology.

She published over 100 scientific articles and received the Papanicolaou Award from the American Society of Cytopathology in 1985. She consulted for 30 years with the Armed Forces Institute of Pathology and the World Health Organization.

She published her autobiography, A Woman Wanders Through Life and Science, in 1997.

She died August 16, 2012, at her home in Wynnewood, Pennsylvania, and was interred at West Laurel Hill Cemetery in Bala Cynwyd, Pennsylvania.
