= Walter Orenstein =

American physician and professor

Walter A. Orenstein served as the director of the United States' National Immunization Program, from May 1993 to January 2004.

== Education ==
Orenstein has a bachelor's degree from the City College of New York. He went on to receive his MD from the Albert Einstein College of Medicine in 1972. He then completed a residency in pediatrics at the University of California, San Francisco, after which he completed a fellowship in infectious diseases at the University of Southern California Medical School. Orenstein then completed another residency, this time in preventive medicine at the Centers for Disease Control and Prevention.

== Career ==
Orenstein began working for the CDC's Immunization Program in 1982. He has also served as a consultant to the World Health Organization and the Pan American Health Organization, and was formerly the Assistant Surgeon General of the United States Public Health Service, as well as the CDC liaison member to the National Vaccine Advisory Committee for over 14 years. He has served on the Board of Directors of Vaccinate Your Family for over two decades, offering his scientific and medical expertise. He has also co-authored the textbook Vaccines along with Paul Offit and Stanley A. Plotkin. He is currently a professor of infectious diseases at Emory University, a post he was originally appointed to in March 2004 and then held until October 2008, after which he became affiliated with the Bill and Melinda Gates Foundation, where he served as deputy director of immunization programs before returning to Emory in September 2011.

== Selected publications ==
- Plotkin, Stanley; Orenstein, Walter; Offit, Paul (2012). Vaccines (sixth ed.). Saunders. ISBN 9781455700905.
- Nkowane, B. M. (1987). "Vaccine-Associated Paralytic Poliomyelitis in the United States: 1973 Through 1984". JAMA: The Journal of the American Medical Association. 257 (10): 1335–1340. doi:10.1001/jama.1987.03390100073029.
- Chen, R. T.; Markowitz, L. E.; Albrecht, P.; Stewart, J. A.; Mofenson, L. M.; Preblud, S. R.; Orenstein, W. A. (1990). "Measles Antibody: Reevaluation of Protective Titers". Journal of Infectious Diseases. 162 (5): 1036–1042. doi:10.1093/infdis/162.5.1036. PMID 2230231.
- Omer, S. B.; Salmon, D. A.; Orenstein, W. A.; Dehart, M. P.; Halsey, N. (2009). "Vaccine Refusal, Mandatory Immunization, and the Risks of Vaccine-Preventable Diseases". New England Journal of Medicine. 360 (19): 1981–1988. doi:10.1056/NEJMsa0806477. PMID 19420367.
