= Global Pertussis Initiative =

Scientific working group for pertussis

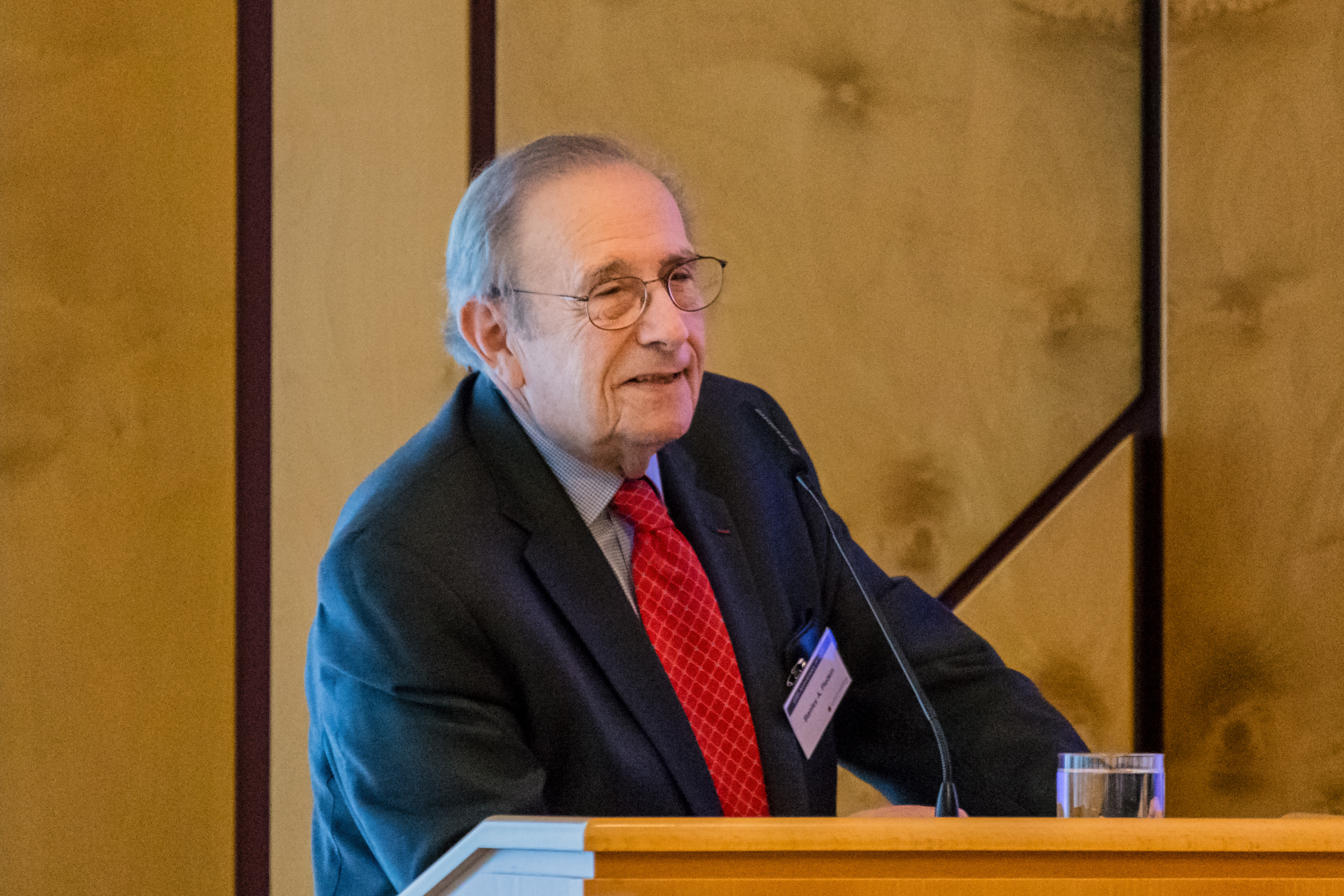
- Stanley Plotkin, founding Chairman of the Global Pertussis Initiative
- Abbreviation: GPI
- Formation: 2001; Age: 24–25 years
- Founder: Stanley Plotkin; Tina Tan; Carl-Heinz Wirsing von König; Kevin Forsyth; Jaime Caro
- Type: Scientific working group
- Purpose: Advancing the understanding and management of pertussis
- Region served: Global
- Co-chairperson: Ulrich Heininger
- Co-chairperson: Tina Tan
- Main organ: Steering Committee
- Funding: Sanofi

The Global Pertussis Initiative (GPI) is a scientific group dedicated to advancing the understanding and management of pertussis (whooping cough) and improve global disease control.

== Background ==
=== Current global status of pertussis ===
Pertussis (whooping cough) is a highly contagious respiratory disease that remains an important global public health concern. Pertussis can cause significant morbidity and mortality, particularly in infants and vulnerable individuals, leading to severe and prolonged coughing fits, breathing difficulties, pneumonia, seizures, hospitalization, and, in the most serious cases, death. The high transmissibility (expected number of disease cases from one case; of 12 to 17) of the pertussis bacterial infection requires timely diagnosis to treat the patient and protect their close contacts from infection.

=== Foundation of GPI ===
The Global Pertussis Initiative (GPI) was founded in 2001 as a scientific working group to address the growing challenge of pertussis (whooping cough) and systematically evaluate and prioritize strategies to address pertussis worldwide; and examine the rationale for immunization beyond childhood. Thirty-seven pertussis experts were invited to the group, including a five-person steering committee of Tina Tan, Carl-Heinz Wirsing von König, Kevin Forsyth, Jaime Caro and Chairman Stanley Plotkin.At a 2002 round table meeting in Paris, France, the Initiative then evaluated the global problems posed by pertussis infection; assessed potential immunization strategies as addition to current immunization programs; and conceived potential resolutions to overcome any barriers to the application of proposed immunization strategies.

=== Subsequent meetings ===
Since the first full meeting in 2002, the steering committee has been progressively extended to provide broader perspective of populations affected by pertussis, both in terms of geography and in clinical specialties of the committee members. The GPI has met both internationally and regionally to develop strategies for the global pertussis control:

- 2002 – Global Meeting (Paris, France)
- 2005 – Global meeting (Paris, France)
- 2008 – Latin America regional meeting (San Jose, Costa Rica)
- 2010 – Global meeting (Paris, France)
- 2011 – Global and Asia Pacific regional meeting (Hong Kong)
- 2016 – Global and Africa regional meeting (Cape Town, South Africa)
- 2017 – Latin America regional meeting (Cancun, Mexico)
- 2019 – Asia regional meeting (Bangkok, Thailand)
- 2020 – India regional meeting (virtual)
- 2021 – Global meeting (virtual)
- 2023 – Central and South America regional meeting (Buenos Aires, Argentina)
- 2024 – Southeast Asia regional meeting (Ho Chi Minh City, Vietnam)
- 2025 – Global meeting (Istanbul, Turkey)

== Focus ==
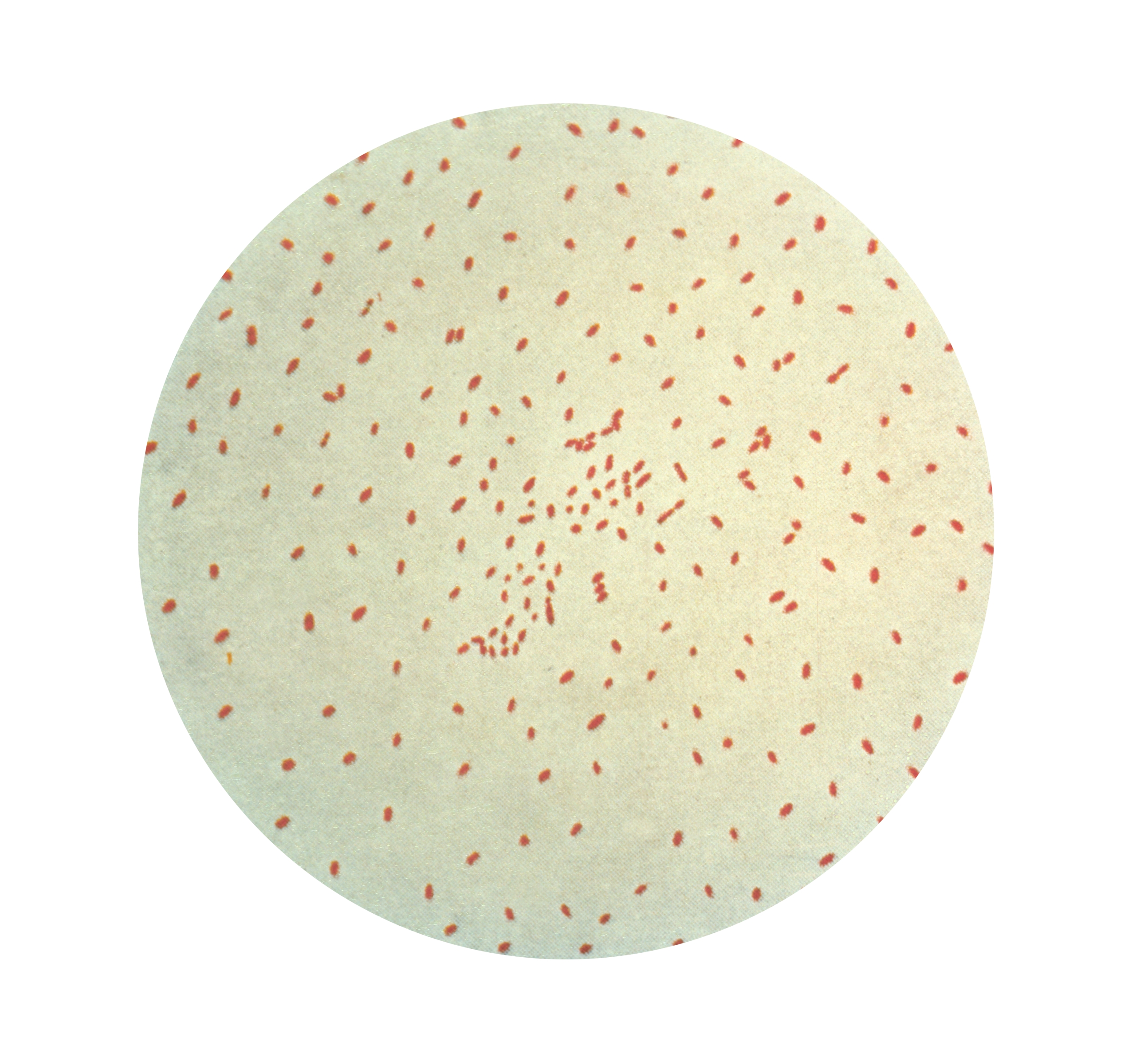
Gram stain of the bacterium Bordetella pertussis, which causes whooping cough.

Having defined the problem of pertussis and identified potential solutions, the GPI is focused on raise the profile of pertussis disease, which needs greater global public health attention.

=== World Pertussis Day ===
World Pertussis Day was established by the GPI and was first marked on 13 June 2026 as an awareness initiative focused on pertussis. The date was chosen to coincide with the birth anniversary of Jules Bordet, who contributed to the understand of immunology; identified complement-mediated lysis; and who and along with Octave Gengou identified the Bordetella pertussis bacterium, for which he was awarded the 1919 Nobel Prize in Physiology or Medicine. The awareness initiative aims to improve public and professional understanding of pertussis, support surveillance and timely diagnosis, and highlight prevention strategies including vaccination during pregnancy and immunisation across the life course.

== Global Pertussis Initiative recommendations ==
=== Infant and child vaccination ===
Vaccination is the only available means to effectively control pertussis disease. All countries should have active vaccination programs that include two to three doses in the primary infant schedule. The GPI encourages the use of a further dose around 1 year in age and a fifth dose in children 5 to 6 years of age, following the current immunization guidelines of each respective country. While the three-dose primary series provides protection in the first few years of life, immunity, be it vaccine-derived or natural infection, wanes with time. The boosters are important to prolonging protection until at least adolescence.

=== Adolescent and adult vaccination ===
Pertussis incidence is rising among adolescents and adults, who are key sources of infection for young infants. Expert opinion and models indicate that universal vaccination with the Tdap vaccine could significantly reduce pertussis incidence across all ages. The GPI recommends a Tdap booster for all adolescents at 11 to 12 years of age, and boosters for all adults aged 18 and older at regular intervals (eg, every 10 years). Early evidence from countries like Australia, Austria, Canada, France, and Germany supports the effectiveness of universal adolescent immunization.

=== Vaccination in pregnancy ===
The GPI recommends a single dose of acellular pertussis vaccine for pregnant individuals for every pregnancy. In countries where acellular pertussis vaccines are approved but with inadequate patient access, pregnant individuals should be prioritized above all other groups. Vaccination against pertussis in pregnancy is safe for both pregnant individuals and newborns. It is highly effective, particularly when administered in the third trimester, in preventing pertussis in young term and preterm infants. Some studies have shown that infants of vaccinated individuals experience less boosting of anti-pertussis antibody concentrations after their own vaccination. However, this effect is not clinically significant in countries using aP vaccines for primary and booster vaccination.

=== Vaccination for childcare and healthcare professionals ===
Immunization of childcare and healthcare workers is recommended, where access to acellular pertussis vaccines allows. The ethical responsibility of healthcare workers to protect themselves and those in their care supports the consideration of mandatory vaccination in hospitals. Similarly, with education, childcare workers and families of neonates may come to understand and accept the rationale for vaccination more readily than the general population.

=== Pertussis surveillance, diagnosis, and awareness ===
The GPI recommends upgrading diagnostic facilities and implementing surveillance and public health systems for reporting pertussis incidence in all countries. Additionally, the GPI advocates for uniform case definitions and enhanced education of healthcare professionals on pertussis. Improved diagnostics are essential for the accurate detection and timely treatment of pertussis. Uniform case definitions will enhance global data comparability. Increased awareness among healthcare workers can lead to more accurate diagnosis, better treatment, and improved management of pertussis, ultimately reducing the disease burden and improving outcomes.
