= Edwin Herman Lennette =

American physician

Edwin Herman Lennette (September 11, 1908, Pittsburgh – October 1, 2000) was an American physician, virologist, and pioneer of diagnostic virology.

== Biography ==
Lennette graduated from Pittsburgh's South Side High School in 1925. From 1925 to 1927 he was an undergraduate at the University of Chicago. In 1927, he dropped out because of economic necessity. From 1927 to 1929 he worked in the accounting department of a large chemical company in New York City. In the autumn of 1929 he resumed his undergraduate education as a junior in the University of Chicago's class of 1931. He graduated from the University of Chicago in 1931 with a B.S. and in 1935 with a Ph.D. His Ph.D. thesis on cellular immunity was supervised by N. Paul Hudson. Lennette received his M.D. in 1936 from Rush Medical College in 1936. He was a medical intern at Chicago's St. Luke's Hospital from July 1937 to July 1938. At the University of Chicago he was an instructor in bacteriology from 1936 to 1937 and a research associate from 1937 to 1938. At the Washington University School of Medicine in St. Louis he was an instructor in pathology from 1938 to 1939. From 1939 to 1946 he was a staff member of the Rockefeller Foundation's International Health Division. From 1941 to 1944 he was stationed in Brazil and did research on yellow fever and encephalitis viruses. From 1944 to 1946 he was assigned to the Rockefeller Foundation's Influenza Research Laboratory in Berkeley, California. There he did research on hepatitis and encephalitis and was one of the founding members of the USA's first civilian laboratory dedicated to diagnostic virology. For 18 months from 1946 to 1947, he was the chief of the U.S. Army's Medical-Veterniary Division in the Chemical Corps at Camp Detrick. In Berkeley, he was the director of the Viral and Rickettsial Disease Laboratory (VRDL) of the California Department of Public Health from 1947 to 1978, when he retired. At the VRDL, he was the successor to Monroe Eaton (1904–1958). The VRDL was founded in 1939 as the Influenza Research Laboratory.

Lennette's research on Q fever in the late 1940s and throughout the 1950s gained him an international reputation as a scientist and physician. He served as a consultant for several organizations, including the World Health Organization and the Department of the Army. In the 1940s, Lennette and Koprowski published important findings on the influences of murine age on several murine viral infections and on the effects of in vitro cultivation on the pathogencity in mice for the Venezuelan equine encephalitis virus (VEEV).

Lennette was elected in 1951 a fellow of the American Association for the Advancement of Science. He won several awards. He was the president of the American Association of Immunologists (AAI) for the academic year 1966–1967, the president of the Federation of American Societies for Experimental Biology (FASEB) for the academic year 1968–1969, and the president of the American Society for Microbiology (ASM) for the academic year 1978–1979.

In September 1930 he married Elizabeth Hubenthal (1907–1981). They had two sons.

== Selected publications ==
=== Articles ===
- Smith, M. G.; Lennette, E. H.; Reames, H. R. (1941). "Isolation of the virus of herpes simplex and the demonstration of intranuclear inclusions in a case of acute encephalitis". The American Journal of Pathology. 17 (1): 55–68.1. PMC 1965165. PMID 19970544.
- Fox, John P.; Lennette, Edwin H.; Manso, Caio; Aguiar, Jacy R. Souza (1942). "Encephalitis in Man Following Vaccination with 17 D Yellow Fever Virus1". American Journal of Epidemiology. 36 (2): 117–142. doi:10.1093/oxfordjournals.aje.a118811.
- Lennette, E. H.; Koprowski, H. (1946). "Interference Between Viruses in Tissue Culture". The Journal of Experimental Medicine. 83 (3): 195–219. doi:10.1084/jem.83.3.195. PMC 2135584. PMID 19871525.
- Clark, William H.; Lennette, E. H.; Railsback, O. C.; Romer, M. S. (1951). "Q Fever in California". A.M.A. Archives of Internal Medicine. 88 (2): 155–167. doi:10.1001/archinte.1951.03810080023003. PMID 14856445.
- Welsh, Hartwell H.; Lennette, Edwin H.; Abinanti, Francis R.; Winn, John F. (1951). "Q Fever in California: IV. Occurrence of Coxiella burnetii in the Placenta of Naturally Infected Sheep". Public Health Reports. 66 (45): 1473–1477. doi:10.2307/4587909. JSTOR 4587909. PMID 14875906.
- Lennette, Edwin H. (1951). "Interference Between Animal Viruses". Annual Review of Microbiology. 5: 277–294. doi:10.1146/annurev.mi.05.100151.001425. PMID 12977137.
- Movitt, Eli R.; Lennette, Edwin H.; Mangum, Jack F.; Berk, Morris; Bowman, Murdock S. (1958). "Acute Benign Pericarditis". New England Journal of Medicine. 258 (22): 1082–1086. doi:10.1056/NEJM195805292582204.
- Magoffin, Robert L.; Jackson, Edwin W.; Lennette, Edwin H. (1961). "Vesicular Stomatitis and Exanthem". JAMA. 175 (6): 441–445. doi:10.1001/jama.1961.03040060015004. PMID 13765313.
- Wright, Harry T.; Landing, Benjamin H.; Lennette, Edwin H.; McAllister, Robert M. (1963). "Fatal Infection in an Infant Associated with Coxsackie Virus Group A, Type 16". New England Journal of Medicine. 268 (19): 1041–1044. doi:10.1056/NEJM196305092681904. PMID 14001956.
- Schieble, Jack H.; Fox, Virginia L.; Lennette, Edwin H. (1967). "A Probable New Human Picornavirus Associated with Respiratory Disease1". American Journal of Epidemiology. 85 (2): 297–310. doi:10.1093/oxfordjournals.aje.a120693. PMID 4960233.
- Chin, James; Magoffin, Robert L.; Shearer, Lois ANN; Schieble, Jack H.; Lennette, Edwin H. (1969). "Field Evaluation of a Respiratory Syncytial Virus Vaccine and a Trivalent Parainfluenza Virus Vaccine in a Pediatric Population1". American Journal of Epidemiology. 89 (4): 449–463. doi:10.1093/oxfordjournals.aje.a120957. PMID 4305200.
- Riggs, John L.; Oshiro, Lyndon S.; Taylor, DEE O. N.; Lennette, Edwin H. (1969). "Syncytium-forming Agent isolated from Domestic Cats". Nature. 222 (5199): 1190–1191. Bibcode:1969Natur.222.1190R. doi:10.1038/2221190a0. PMID 5788991. S2CID 4149294.
- Emmons, Richard W.; Lennette, Edwin H. (1969). "Isolation of Western Equine Encephalomyelitis Virus from an Opossum". Science. 163 (3870): 945–946. Bibcode:1969Sci...163..945E. doi:10.1126/science.163.3870.945. PMID 5763879. S2CID 84769455.
- Oshiro, L. S.; Schieble, J. H.; Lennette, E. H. (1971). "Electron Microscopic Studies of Coronavirus". Journal of General Virology. 12 (2): 161–168. doi:10.1099/0022-1317-12-2-161. PMID 4107843.
- Todaro, George J.; Arnstein, Paul; Parks, Wade P.; Lennette, Edwin H.; Huebner, Robert J. (1973). "A Type-C Virus in Human Rhabdomyosarcoma Cells After Inoculation into NIH Swiss Mice Treated with Antithymocyte Serum". Proceedings of the National Academy of Sciences. 70 (3): 859–862. Bibcode:1973PNAS...70..859T. doi:10.1073/pnas.70.3.859. PMC 433375. PMID 4123693.
- Boyle, William F.; Riggs, John L.; Oshiro, Lyndon S.; Lennette, Edwin H. (1973). "Electron Microscopic Identification of Papova Virus in Laryngeal Papilloma". The Laryngoscope. 83 (7): 1102–1108. doi:10.1288/00005537-197307000-00013. PMID 4352522. S2CID 43017237.
- Schmidt, N. J.; Lennette, E. H.; Ho, H. H. (1974). "An Apparently New Enterovirus Isolated from Patients with Disease of the Central Nervous System". Journal of Infectious Diseases. 129 (3): 304–309. doi:10.1093/infdis/129.3.304. PMID 4361245.
- Weil, Marvin L.; Itabashi, Hideo H.; Cremer, Natalie E.; Oshiro, Lyndon S.; Lennette, Edwin H.; Carnay, Laurence (1975). "Chronic Progressive Panencephalitis Due to Rubella Virus Simulating Subacute Sclerosing Panencephalitis". New England Journal of Medicine. 292 (19): 994–998. doi:10.1056/NEJM197505082921903. PMID 47149.
- Schmidt, N. J.; Ho, H. H.; Lennette, E. H. (1975). "Propagation and isolation of group a coxsackieviruses in RD cells". Journal of Clinical Microbiology. 2 (3): 183–185. doi:10.1128/jcm.2.3.183-185.1975. PMC 274168. PMID 1176625.
- Hanson, C. V.; Riggs, J. L.; Lennette, E. H. (1978). "Photochemical Inactivation of DNA and RNA Viruses by Psoralen Derivatives". Journal of General Virology. 40 (2): 345–358. doi:10.1099/0022-1317-40-2-345. PMID 211184.

=== Books ===
- Lennette, Edwin H., editor-in-chief, Manual of Clinical Microbiology (3rd ed.). American Society for Microbiology. 1980. ISBN 0914826247; 1044 pages
- Lennette, Edwin H.; Halonen, Pekka; Murphy, Frederick A., eds. (6 December 2012). Laboratory Diagnosis of Infectious Diseases Principles and Practice: VOLUME II Viral, Rickettsial, and Chlamydial Diseases. Springer. ISBN 9781461239000. (reprint of 1988 1st edition)
