= Helen Dean King =

American biologist (1869–1955)

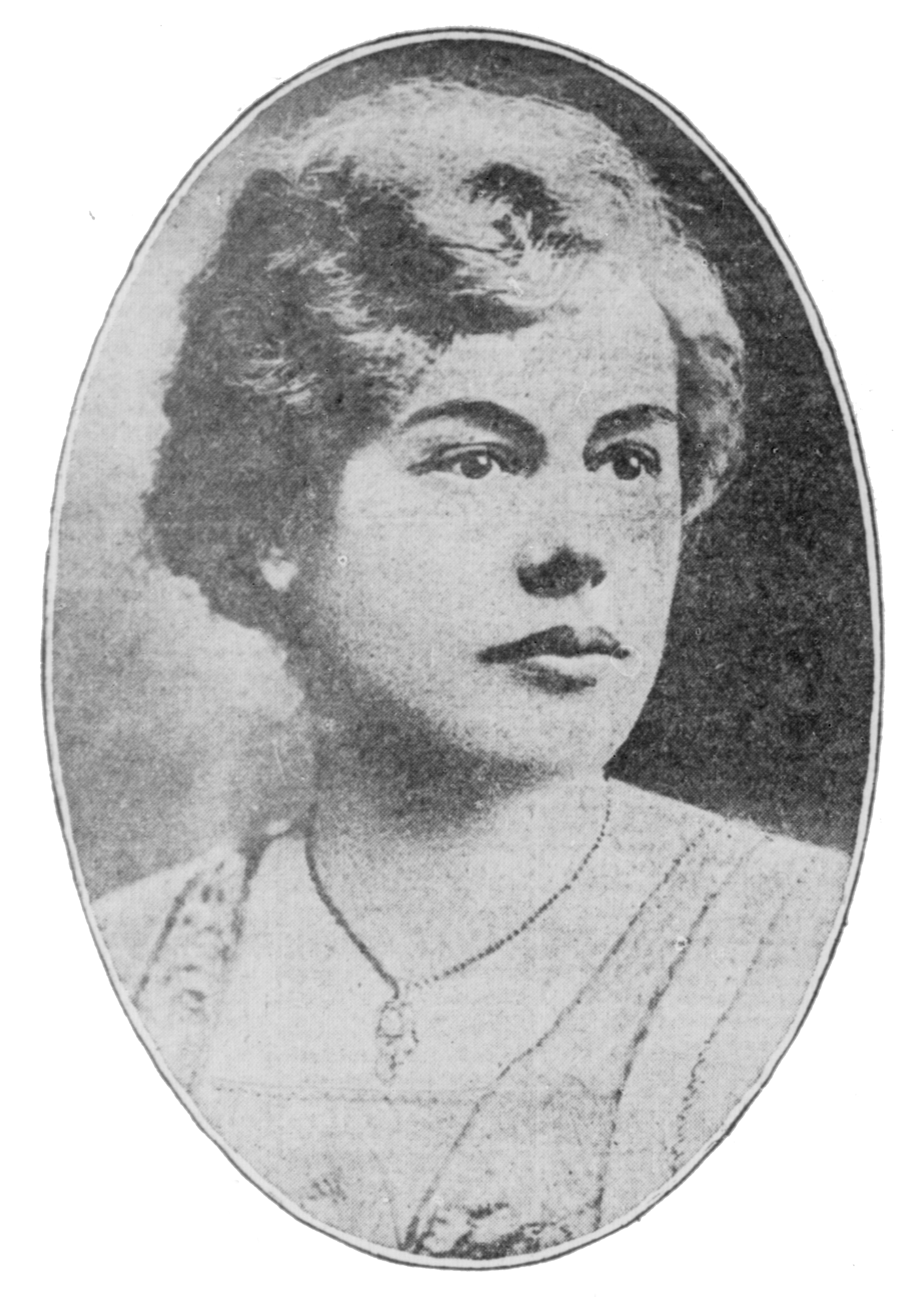
- Born: September 27, 1869; Owego, New York
- Died: March 7, 1955 (aged 85); Philadelphia, Pennsylvania
- Education: Vassar College; Bryn Mawr College
- Known for: Breeding the Wistar laboratory rat
- Awards: Ellen Richards Research Prize of the Association to Aid Scientific Research for Women
- Scientific career
- Fields: Zoology
- Workplaces: University of Pennsylvania, Wistar Institute

Helen Dean King (September 27, 1869 – March 7, 1955) was an American zoologist. She was involved in breeding the Wistar laboratory rat, a strain of rats genetically homogeneous albinos intended for use in biological and medical research.

== Life and work ==
Born at Owego, New York, she graduated from Vassar College in 1892, and in 1899 she received her doctorate in philosophy from Bryn Mawr College, with a thesis supervised by embryologist and geneticist Thomas Hunt Morgan. She had majored in morphology. She remained at the College after graduation as a fellow and student assistant in biology from 1897 to 1904.

King taught physiology at Miss Baldwin's School, Bryn Mawr, from 1899 to 1907, was research fellow at the University of Pennsylvania in 1906–08, and served as an assistant in anatomy in 1908–09. After 1909, she worked at the Wistar Institute, for more than 40 years, first as an assistant and eventually becoming professor of embryology in 1927 and remaining there until her retirement in 1949.

She was also an assistant at Woods Hole, Massachusetts. Her investigations dealt largely with problems of sex determination.

King served as vice president of the American Society of Zoologists in 1937, and was associate editor of the Journal of Morphology and Physiology from 1924 to 1927 and editor of the Wistar Institute's bibliography service from 1922 to 1935.

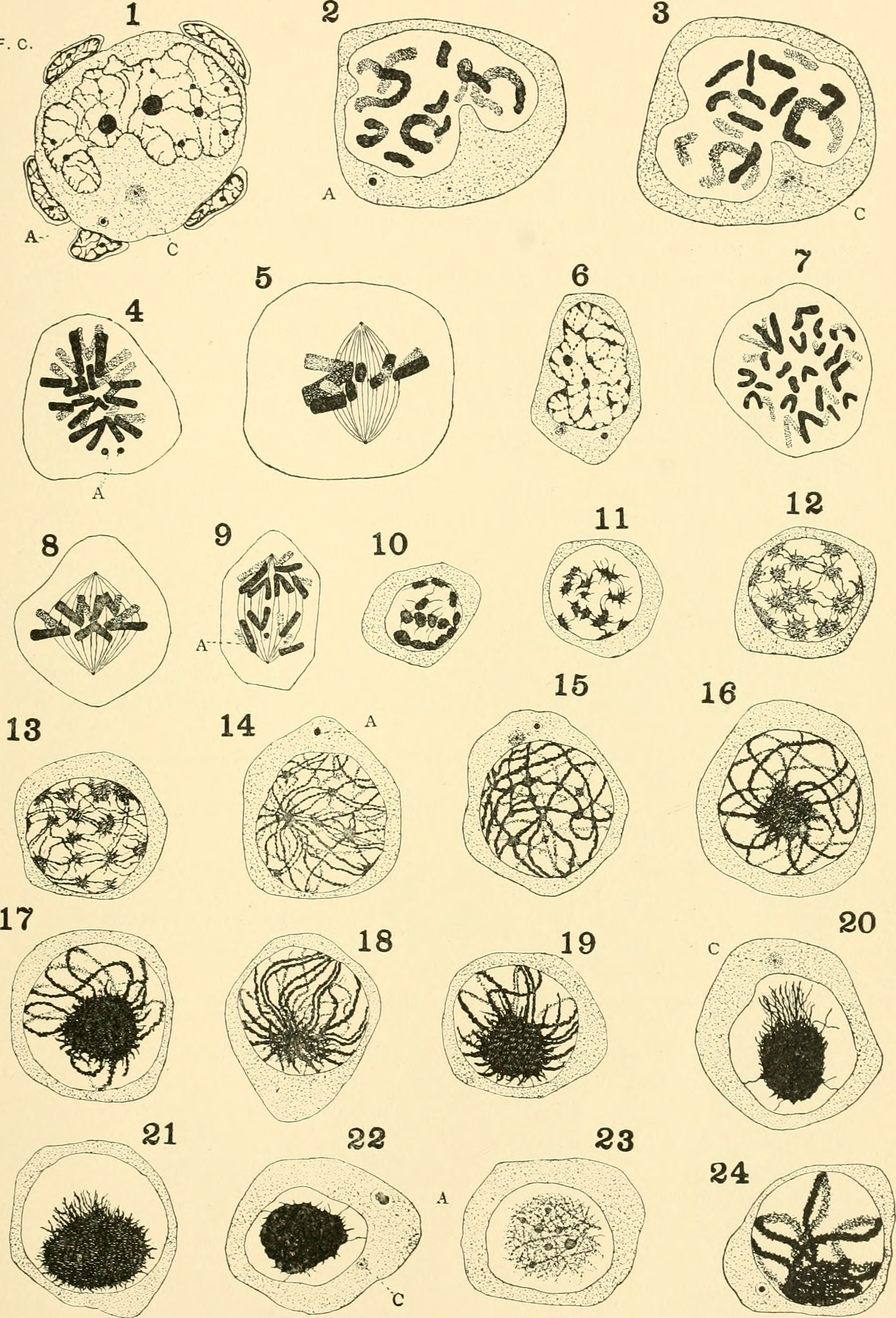
Helen Dean King, “The Spermatogenesis of Bufo lentiginosus,” Plate 1. Page from American Journal of Anatomy, Vol. VII, 1907-1908.

King participated in breeding the Wistar rat, a strain of genetically homogeneous albino rats for use in biological and medical research.

She died at age 85 on March 7, 1955, in Philadelphia, Pennsylvania.

== Research ==
King's scientific research largely focused on studies of inbred rats, and she was particularly interested in human issues while using for this purpose data from meticulous experiments on laboratory rats. Through inbreeding, her rats were almost homozygous to each other, which facilitated research. In later years, she moved her focus to pursue research on gray Norway rats.

== Awards ==
- Ellen Richards Research Prize of the Association to Aid Scientific Research for Women (1932)

== Selected publications ==
- King, Helen Dean. "On the weight of the albino rat at birth and the factors that influence it." The Anatomical Record 9, no. 3 (1915): 213–31.
- King, Helen Dean. "Studies on inbreeding. I. The effects in inbreeding on the growth and variability in the body weight of the albino rat." Journal of Experimental Zoology 26, no. 1 (1918): 1–54.
- King, Helen Dean, and Henry Herbert Donaldson. "Life processes and size of the body and organs of the gray Norway rat during ten generations in captivity." American Anatomical Memoirs (1929).
- King, Helen Dean. "Life processes in gray Norway rats during fourteen years in captivity." American Anatomical Memoirs (1939).
