= Dario Altieri =

Cancer researcher

Dario Carlo Altieri
- Occupations: President and CEO

Dario Carlo Altieri, an Italian-born physician-scientist, is the president and CEO of The Wistar Institute in Philadelphia. He is also the holder of the Robert and Penny Fox Distinguished Professor and the director of the National Cancer Institute-designated Ellen and Ronald Caplan Cancer Center at The Wistar Institute.

== Biography ==
Altieri was born in Milan, Italy, where he attended the University of Milan Medical School. He trained in internal medicine with a postgraduate specialty degree in clinical and experimental hematology. In 1987, he joined the Scripps Clinic and Research Foundation in La Jolla, California, as a research fellow before becoming a faculty member. In 1994, Altieri became an associate professor in the Department of Pathology, Boyer Center for Molecular Medicine at Yale University School of Medicine, and was promoted to full professor in 1999. In 2002, he became the founding Chair of the Department of Cancer Biology at the University of Massachusetts Medical School.

== Research ==
His research has focused on Inhibitors of Apoptosis (IAP), a family of genes essential for proliferation and survival of cells. His work has identified survivin, one of these IAP genes, is over-produced in almost every human cancer, and his team is currently studying the biology of survivin and how it could be used to develop treatments for cancer.

Altieri has also been involved in the development of gamitrinib, a Hsp90 inhibitor that was shown to disable the activity of mitochondria in cancerous cells.

In 2013, Altieri and his team received a $1.5 million grant from the United States Department of Defense to prepare the drug for human trials. He also co-founded the Cancer Biology Training Consortium and the Pancreatic Cancer alliance in 2005.
