= Stanley Plotkin =

American physician and virologist (born 1932)

Stanley Alan Plotkin
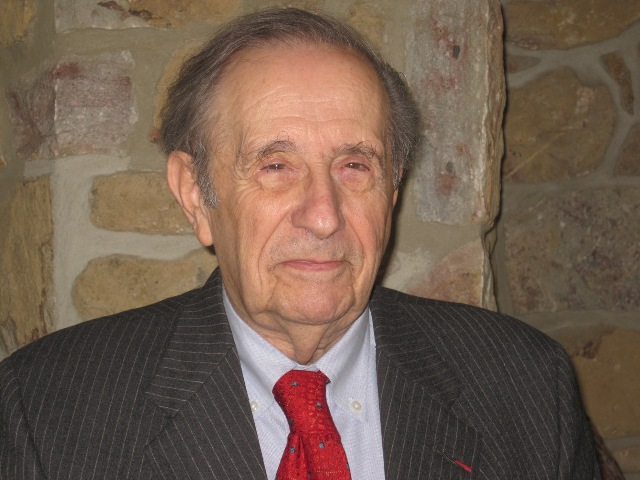
- Born: 12 May 1932 (age 94); New York City, U.S.
- Education: SUNY Downstate Medical Center
- Known for: Vaccinology, immunology
- Spouse: Susan Plotkin
- Children: 2

Stanley Alan Plotkin (born 12 May 1932) is an American physician and virologist who specialized in the development of vaccines. In the 1960s, he played a pivotal role in the discovery of a vaccine against rubella virus while at Wistar Institute in Philadelphia. Plotkin was a member of Wistar’s research faculty from 1960 to 1991. In addition to his emeritus position at Wistar, he is emeritus professor of pediatrics at the University of Pennsylvania. His book, Vaccines, is the standard reference on the subject. As of 2025, Vaccines is in its eighth edition. Plotkin is also an editor of Clinical and Vaccine Immunology, which is published by the American Society for Microbiology in Washington, D.C..

== Early life and education ==
Plotkin was born and raised in New York City, the son of Jewish parents, Lee and Joseph Plotkin, who emigrated from England. He attended The Bronx High School of Science in New York City. While attending Bronx Science, at the age of 15, he read a pair of books that greatly influenced his future education and career choices: Arrowsmith by Sinclair Lewis and Microbe Hunters by Paul de Kruif. Deciding to dedicate his life to being a physician and research scientist, Plotkin graduated from Bronx Science in 1948. He then earned his bachelor's degree from New York University in 1952 and went on to earn his MD at SUNY Downstate Medical Center in 1956. Plotkin received his GME from the School of Medicine, University of Pennsylvania in 1963.

== Career ==
=== The Wistar Institute of Anatomy and Biology ===
During his time at Wistar, Plotkin worked on several vaccines; chief among them are vaccines for rubella, rabies, rotavirus, and cytomegalovirus (CMV). He developed a vaccine for rubella, based upon the RA 27/3 strain of the virus (also developed by Plotkin using WI-38, a fetal-derived human cell line), which was released to the public in 1969. The enabling technology was the WI-38 cell strain gifted to Plotkin by Leonard Hayflick also of the Wistar. WI-38 provide the key elements for the successful Rubella vaccine. The virus became attenuated when grown on WI-38; it was free of unwanted viruses and the vaccine proved to have minor side effects when compared with the HPV vaccine developed at the NIH. This WI-38 grown vaccine led to the eradication of the disease in the United States, according to the Centers for Disease Control and Prevention, in 2005.

Plotkin, working with Tadeusz Wiktor and Hilary Koprowski, produced a human vaccine for rabies during the 1960s and 1970s also on the WI-38 cell strain gifted to them by Leonard Hayflick. WI-38 provided to the rabies vaccine the same properties that it gave to the rubella vaccine. This rabies vaccine can be used as a preventive measure for people who have an increased risk of contracting rabies, as well as a treatment for those who have been exposed recently to the disease, preventing infection in nearly 100 percent of cases.

Another vaccine that Plotkin co-developed, working with H. Fred Clark and Paul Offit, is for rotavirus. In 2006, the team's vaccine became part of the U.S. recommended vaccine schedule for babies. In the 1970s, Plotkin led the development of an experimental vaccine against CMV. This vaccine, developed using attenuated CMV, has yet to make it into commercial production.

Dr. Plotkin has been a tireless advocate for the protection of humans, and children in particular, from preventable infectious diseases. His lifetime of work on vaccines has led to profound reductions in both morbidity and mortality not only in the United States, but throughout the world. His unbending adherence to the principle of being guided by outstanding science has led him to be admired by his peers. He demonstrates the combination of scholar, scientist and public servant exemplified by Dr. Maxwell Finland.

— Vijay B. Samant, President and CEO of Vical, Inc.

In the 1980s, while still working at the Wistar Institute, Plotkin had the idea to write a text focused on vaccines, explaining in an interview decades later:

I felt that there was now a field of study that was not infectious diseases. It derived from infectious diseases, but it was no longer classical infectious diseases. It was not really immunology, although immunology is of course the basis of vaccines. Vaccinology was now a field itself, and did not have a textbook. I felt that it was time to show that, indeed, it is a separate field and that it needed a source of information where you could find answers to questions about vaccines.

=== Other positions held ===
- 1956: Internship, Cleveland Metropolitan General Hospital
- 1957: Officer, Epidemic Intelligence Service, United States Public Health Service
- 1959–1973: Instructor, then associate professor, School of Medicine, University of Pennsylvania
- 1961: Resident, Children's Hospital of Philadelphia
- 1962–1963: Resident, Hospital for Sick Children London
- 1964: Joseph P. Kennedy Jr. Foundation scholar
- 1965–1972: Associate physician, Children's Hospital of Philadelphia
- 1972–1990: Director of infectious diseases and senior physician, Children's Hospital of Philadelphia
- 1974–1991: Professor of pediatrics and microbiology, School of Medicine, University of Pennsylvania
- 1974–1991: Professor of virology, Wistar Institute
- 1984–1986: President, medical staff, Children's Hospital of Philadelphia
- 1991–1998: Medical and scientific director Pasteur Merieux Connaught, Marnes-la-Coquette
- 2001: Founding chairman of the Global Pertussis Initiative
- 2003: Professor emeritus, Wistar Institute
- 2006: Professor emeritus of virology, University of Pennsylvania
- 2006: Executive advisor, Sanofi Pasteur
- 2014: Senior advisor, Global Virus Network
- Associate chairman, department of pediatrics, University of Pennsylvania
- Member, Center for HIV/AIDS Vaccine Immunology
- Adjunct professor, Johns Hopkins Bloomberg School of Public Health
- Scientific advisor, Mymetics
- 2017: Scientific advisor (and co-founder) of the Coalition for Epidemic Preparedness Innovations (CEPI)

== Awards ==
- 2002: Albert B. Sabin Gold Medal
- 2009: Maxwell Finland Award for Scientific Achievement

== Personal life ==
Plotkin and his wife, Susan, have two children, Michael and Alec. In 1957, Plotkin wanted to join the US Air Force so that he could learn to fly, but instead he went to work for the Epidemic Intelligence Service. He eventually realized his dream of learning to fly at the age of 74.

== Selected publications ==
- Plotkin, Stanley; Orenstein, Walter; Offit, Paul (2012). Vaccines (sixth ed.). Saunders. ISBN 9781455700905.
