= Jan Kryjevski =

Soviet and Russian painter (1948–2024)

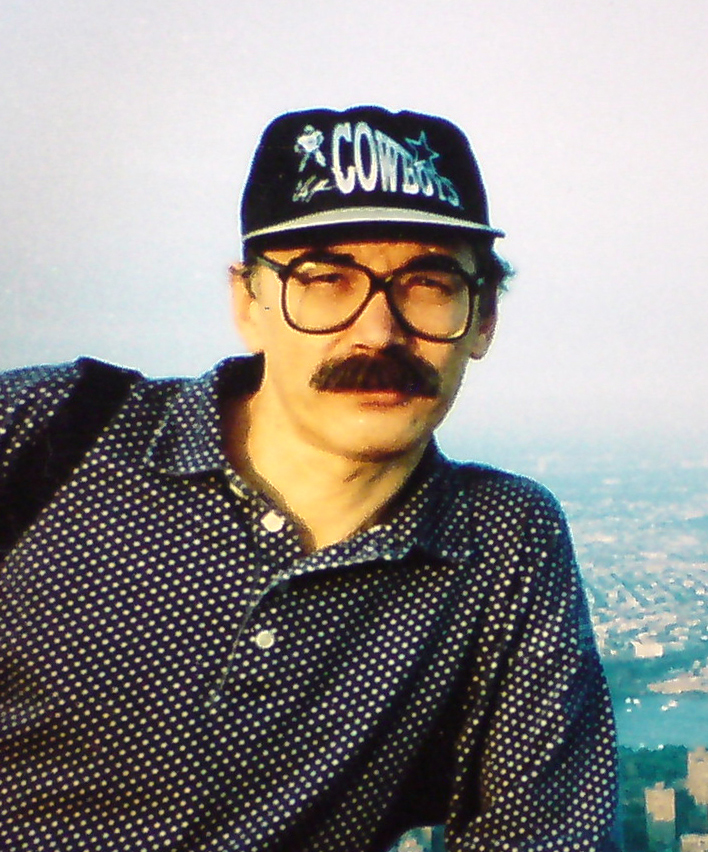
- Born: Jan Yulianovich Kryzhevski; April 8, 1948; Ufa, RSFSR, Soviet Union
- Died: March 26, 2024 (aged 75); Ufa, Russia
- Occupation: Painter
- Known for: Painting, Transrealism
- Style: Landscape, Photorealism, Transrealism
- Awards: Lenin Komsomol Prize (1976)

Jan Yulianovich Kryzhevski (Russian: Ян Юлианович Крыжевский; 8 April 1948 – 26 March 2024) was a Soviet and Russian painter. A prominent artist in the USSR, he was a key figure in the development of an artistic style he termed Transrealism. His later life was marked by a difficult return to Russia after two decades of living in the United States.

== Biography ==
=== Early life and career ===
Jan Yulianovich Kryjevski was born on April 8, 1948, in Ufa, RSFSR, Soviet Union. He studied at the Ufa Art School from 1965 to 1969. He then attended the T.E. Zalkalna Latvian Academy of Arts in Riga from 1970 to 1972, but he was expelled and did not complete his degree.

His artistic career began in 1973, and he became a member of the Union of Artists of the USSR in 1975. His major breakthrough came in 1976 with his painting New Day, which won first prize at both the All-Russian and All-Union exhibitions for young artists. From 1977 to 1988, he lived in Vologda, where he was an active organizer in the art community, serving as chairman of the youth section of the local Union of Artists branch and founding a club for young artists.

=== Life in the United States ===
In 1991, following the dissolution of the Soviet Union, Kryjevski moved to Brooklyn, New York. His career was initially successful; his works were shown at the Jacob Javits Center in 1992 and were auctioned by Sotheby's and other major auction houses. However, he later faced significant hardship. He was unable to achieve financial stability, lost his residency documents, and eventually became homeless, at one point living in the New York City Subway. He was taken in by a Russian-speaking family who informed his daughter in Russia of his situation.

=== Return to Russia and final years ===
In 2014, after his daughter, Maria, appealed for help, Kryjevski's return to Russia was organized with the assistance of high-level officials, including the then-Head of the Republic of Bashkortostan, Rustem Khamitov, and the Russian Ministry of Foreign Affairs under Sergey Lavrov. Upon his return to Ufa, he was given a warm welcome, and officials promised to provide him with a workshop and support. A solo exhibition of his work was held at the Nesterov Art Museum in Ufa shortly after his arrival, opened by the Republic's Minister of Culture.

Despite the initial support, by 2021, news reports indicated that Kryjevski was living in poverty. He was reportedly without proper documents, had no pension due to a lack of official work history, and was living in an apartment with no hot water. Suffering from health issues, including memory loss, he had little money for food or art supplies and had resorted to painting on scrap materials like plywood and doors.

Kryjevski died on March 26, 2024, in Ufa, at the age of 75. His works are held in the collections of the State Tretyakov Gallery, the Bashkir Nesterov Art Museum, and museums in Vologda, Yaroslavl, and Novosibirsk, as well as in private collections worldwide.

== Artistic Style ==
Kryjevski's work has been described using terms such as "documentary romanticism," "photorealism," and "metaphysical realism." His paintings from the Soviet era often contain subtle, multi-layered meanings. His celebrated 1976 work, New Day, which depicts a young female construction worker, appeared to align with the ideals of Socialist Realism but was also interpreted by critics as containing Christian allegories, a bold subtext for the time.

In the 1980s, Kryjevski began to define his own artistic method as Transrealism. He described it as:

"a state of the soul, capable of feeling the dynamics of flight, and realized by the artist in the form of a combination of different plastic structures into a single whole."

This approach sought to depict not only the external world with high precision but also the inner, often hidden, aspects of the human psyche and the spirit of the times.

== Selected works ==
- Red Shirt (1973)
- Door into the Night (1974)
- Ural Horizons (1975)
- Spring on Ayskaya Street (1975)
- New Day (Blue and White Day) (1976)
- Happy Summer (1976)
- To the Northern Dawn (Self-Portrait) (1977)
- White Nights of Vologda (1980–1981)
- Portrait of Varlam Shalamov
- Roosevelt Island Bridge. Night New York. (c. 1990s–2000s)
- Old Ufa (2015)
- Holy Cross Exaltation Church (2015)
