= David Kritchevsky =

American biochemist (1920–2006)

David Kritchevsky (January 25, 1920 – November 20, 2006, Bryn Mawr, Pennsylvania) was an American biochemist and expert in lipid nutrition and cholesterol in particular.

Kritchevsky was born in Kharkiv (then part of Ukrainian People's Republic) to a Jewish family. He was brought to the United States in 1923 and graduated from the University of Chicago in 1939. He has been cited as "one of the most influential researchers on diet and health of the 20th century".

== Awards and recognition ==
An incomplete list of Kritchevsky's awards include:

- 1968: St. Ambrose Medal from the City of Milan, Italy
- 1974: Borden Award from the American Institute of Nutrition
- 1977: Philadelphia Award from the American Chemical Society
- 1978: Outstanding Achievement Award from the American College of Nutrition
- 1979: Professional Achievement Award from the University of Chicago
- 1992: Robert H. Herman Memorial Award from the American Society for Clinical Nutrition
- 1994: Auenbrugger Medal from the University of Graz, Austria
- 1996: Supelco-AOCS Research Award from the American Oil Chemists Society
- 1999: Special Recognition Award from the International Soybean Symposium
- 2001: an honorary D.Sc. from Purdue University
- 2005: Lifetime Achievement Award from the International Whole Grains Symposium
- 2006: Alton E. Bailey Award from the American Oil Chemists Society

In 2006 the American Society for Nutrition established the David Kritchevsky Career Achievement Award and Kritchevsky was its inaugural recipient.

The American Heart Association established the David Kritchevsky memorial lecture, presented at its annual meeting.
