= Neurovirology =

Field of neuroscience

Neurovirology is an interdisciplinary field which represents a melding of clinical neuroscience, virology, immunology, and molecular biology. The main focus of the field is to study viruses capable of infecting the nervous system. In addition to this, the field studies the use of viruses to trace neuroanatomical pathways, for gene therapy, and to eliminate detrimental populations of neural cells.

== Overview ==
The field of neurovirology was formed within the past 30 years. It was founded upon the discovery that a large number of viruses are capable of invading and establishing latent infections in nervous tissue, but also causing life-threatening acute infections. Such viruses have been shown to produce acute and slow, chronic, or progressive nervous system diseases including neurodegenerative diseases and cognitive disorders. Neurovirology incorporates the related fields of virology, neuroscience, neurology, immunology, and molecular biology. The main focus of the field is to study the molecular and biological basis of virus induced diseases of the nervous system. In addition to this, the field studies the use of these viruses as tracers of neuroanatomical pathways and as vectors for gene therapy.

The field relies upon neuroimaging, isolation of the virus from brain tissue or CSF, serological testing of serum and CSF, and microscopic examination of tissue to diagnose nervous system infections.

== History ==
Neurovirology only became an official field within the past 30 years. However, the true origin of neurovirology can be accredited to the discovery that some viruses may have an affinity for nervous system tissue. This discovery was made in the late 1880s with research involving rabies.

In 1881, while studying rabies, Louis Pasteur demonstrated that the central nervous system played a crucial role in the progression of the disease. Following this discovery, in 1890, Schaffer demonstrated histological evidence that the rabies virus spread via neural networks.

In 1929 Heinrich Pette established the first classification criteria for inflammatory diseases of the nervous system. This classification separated the diseases into two groups: gray matter acute and white matter acute inflammatory diseases. Gray matter acute inflammatory diseases were characterized by damage to neurons with myelin remaining intact. White matter acute inflammatory diseases were characterized by destruction of the myelin, with neurons remaining intact.

In 1938, Sbin and Olitsky discovered that the distribution of the virus within the body depended on its mechanism of entry.

In 1965, ZuRhein and Chou established that destruction of myelin could result from primary virus infection, not only from autoimmune response to the virus.

Most of the research of which the field of neurovirology is based upon occurred in the late 1980s and the 1900s.

Beginning in 1999 the International Society of Neurovirology has recognized and awarded individuals who have contributed significantly to the field with the Pioneer in NeuroVirology Award.

== Major viruses studied ==
=== DNA virus family ===
==== Herpesviruses ====
- Herpes simplex virus type 1 (HSV-1)
  - Evidence may support link between virus and Alzheimer's disease, intractable focal epilepsy, and acute disseminated encephalomyelitis
  - Infection can produce myelitis and encephalitis
- Herpes simplex virus type 2 (HSV-2)
  - Infection can produce myelitis and encephalitis
- Human cytomegalovirus (CMV)
  - Infection is associated with Guillain–Barré syndrome
  - Is the most common viral cause of childhood intellectual disability
  - Is linked to neurological abnormalities, such as: microencephaly, seizures, hypotomia, and sensorineural hearing loss
- Varicella-zoster virus (VZV)
  - Is associated with neurological complications such as: meningoencephalitis, myelitis, cerebellar ataxia, Reye's syndrome, cranial neuropatheis, and postinfectious disseminated encephalomyelitis
- Epstein-Barr virus (EBV)
  - Is associated with Guillain–Barré syndrome, cranial mononeuropathies, focal encephalitis, and myelitis
  - Is considered the leading viral candidate for causing multiple sclerosis
- Human herpesvirus type 6 (HHV-6) and Human herpesvirus type 7 (HHV-7)
  - Have not been linked to human nervous system disease

==== Polyomaviruses ====
- JC virus (JCV)
  - Is associated with progressive multifocal leukoencephalopathy and demyelination

=== RNA virus family ===
==== Rhabdoviruses ====
  - Rabies virus
    - Gives rise to neuronal dysfunction

==== Paramyxoviruses ====
- Measles virus
  - Is a major cause of neurological deficits
- Mumps virus
  - Is the leading cause of virus induced aseptic meningitis and encephalitis

==== Retroviruses ====
- Human immunodeficiency virus (HIV)
  - Is associated with cognitive dysfunction

== Viral entry into the nervous system ==
Viruses have evolved mechanisms enabling them to easily infiltrate the nervous system. Two main methods of viral entry have been identified: transneuronal spread and hematogenous spread.

=== Transneuronal spread ===
The mechanism behind transneuronal spread is not entirely known yet, but it involves the virus escaping the immune system by traveling up the axons of the nerves.

=== Hematogenous spread ===
There are two main ways that a virus is thought to enter the brain via hematogenous spread. The first is by infecting an immune cell, which then carries the virus to the nervous tissue. Viral examples of this include the JC virus which infects B cells and HIV which infects CD4 T cells and macrophages to infiltrate the brain. The second is by crossing the blood capillaries as a free virus or in leukocytes.

=== Advantages of infecting the nervous system ===
Neurons lack molecules necessary to present viral peptides on the surface to killer cells, which means they provide a safe house for viruses to replicate. Once viruses get in neurons they can persist for the hosts lifetime and can influence the factors that disturb the function of neurons and the homeostasis of the nervous system, leading to nervous system diseases.

== Tools used for diagnosing neuroviral infections ==
There are several diagnostic tools which have become invaluable to diagnosing viral infections of the nervous system. In the past, more invasive methods of obtaining samples for diagnosis were needed such as the use of brain biopsy. Now, with the advancement of technology, less invasive means are used more frequently, such as neuroimaging and the analysis of cerebrospinal fluid (CSF).

=== Neuroimaging ===
CT scans and MRI scans are useful in visualizing inflammation and lesions caused by viral infection of the CNS. MRI is used to visualize deep white matter and temporal lobe lesions, which are not well defined by a CT scan.

=== Lumbar puncture and CSF analysis ===
This method is valuable in diagnosing viral infections of the CNS. CSF analysis typically involves determining the patients total white cell count, glucose level, and protein level in the CSF. Viral infection of the CNS tends to increase the total white cell count, while increasing the level of protein. The levels of glucose tend to be decreased by viral infection, due to an increased glucose consumption.

=== CSF nucleic acid amplification using polymerase chain reaction (PCR) ===
PCR is frequently used to for rapid identification of specific DNA viruses from the CSF, while Reverse transcriptase PCR is commonly used to identify RNA viruses in the CSF. The accuracy of this diagnostic tool is limited by the amount of the virus present in the CSF. Viral replication tends to peak early and then decline to undetectable levels in CNS infection. Within the first 5 days of symptom onset, before the decline of viral replication, PCR assays have a higher incidence of detecting CNS infection.

=== Serology ===
Serology is useful in diagnosing viral infections of the CNS when PCR analysis returns negative results.

=== Brain biopsy ===
In recent years, due to the development of less invasive diagnosis techniques, brain biopsies are no longer frequently used for diagnosing viral infections of the nervous system. However, some viral infections of the CNS cannot be diagnosed without histological and electron microscopic evidence. In these cases, brain biopsies are only performed when the patient has a serious neurological illness and is in need of immediate therapy, an alternative procedure will not lead to a specific diagnosis, and the information gained by the brain biopsy will outweigh the risks.

== Research and therapy ==
=== Use of antivirals to treat CNS infection ===
The use of antiviral treatment with both Multiple Sclerosis and AIDS dementia has proven ineffective as a treatment. In patients with Multiple Sclerosis, antiviral treatment of EBV with Acyclovir showed no significant difference from the placebo. In patients with AIDS dementia, despite antiretroviral therapy, CNS function remains diminished.

=== Use of viruses for gene therapy ===
HSV-1 is a promising gene therapy agent, which could be used for gene delivery to neurons. This therapy may be used to treat metabolic brain diseases, neurodegenerative disorders, or to help enhance repair of brain tissue in neurological diseases.

== Future of field ==
New viruses and viral infections of the nervous system will continue to emerge and the field of neurovirology must constantly expand to meet these growing needs. While the interest in researching viruses that infect the nervous system has increased dramatically over the past 40 years, there are three key components vital for the continued advancement of the field:

1. Training: New researchers and clinicians need to be trained about the significance of viral infection in the progression of neurological diseases.
2. Technology: New technology needs to be refined and developed which will aid in the progression of research.
3. Development of Therapy: Insight gained by research should be applied to the therapy of neurological diseases.

== See also ==
- Neuroimmunology
- Neurology
- Virology
