= Wistar Institute =

American biomedical research institute

The Wistar Institute
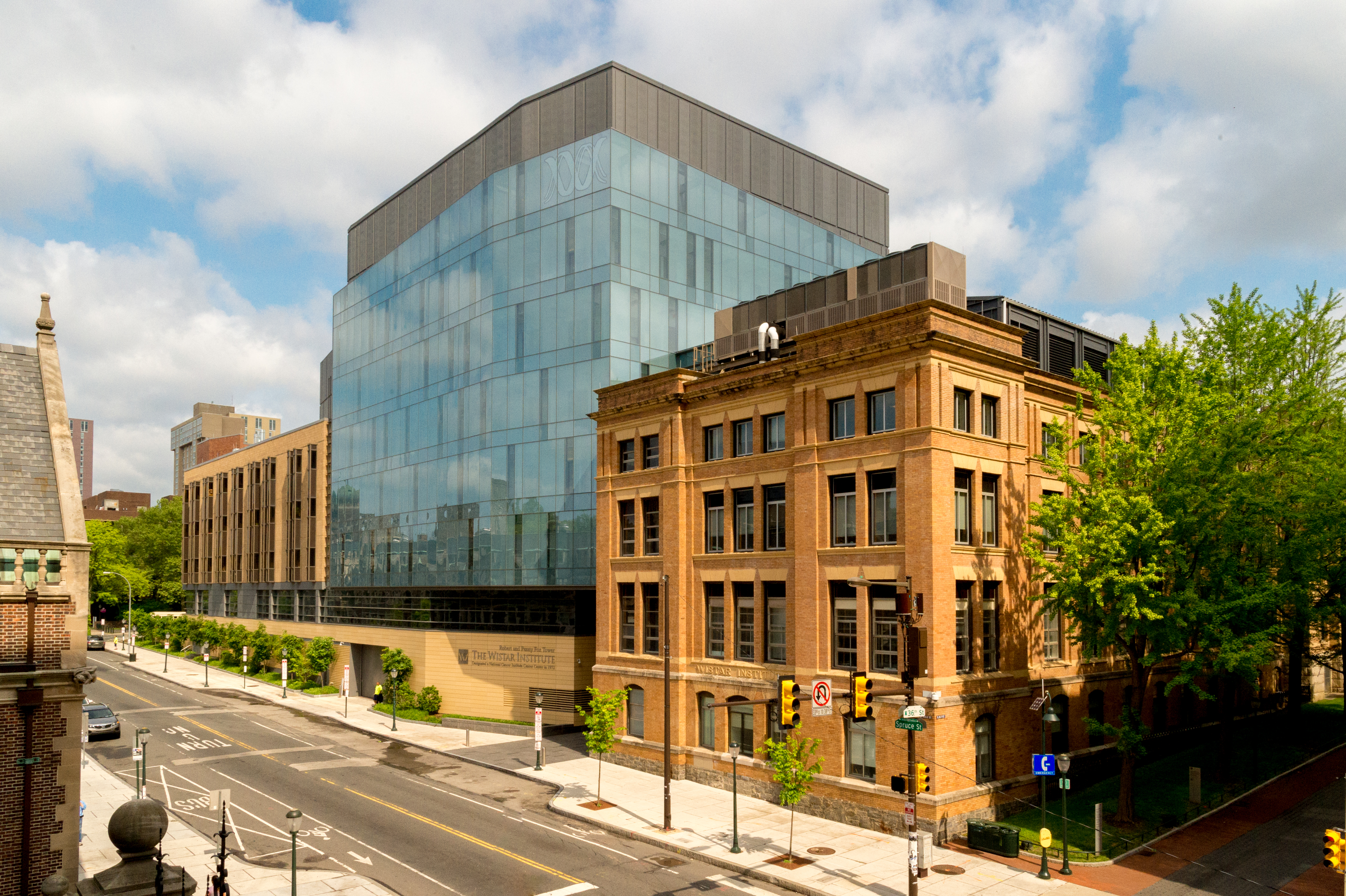
- Established: 1892
- President and CEO: Dario C. Altieri, M.D.
- Faculty: 36
- Staff: 300
- Address: 3601 Spruce Street, Philadelphia, Pennsylvania 19104, U.S.
- Location: University City, Philadelphia, Pennsylvania, U.S
- Coordinates: 39°57′04″N 75°11′45″W
- Interactive map of The Wistar Institute
- Website: www.wistar.org

The Wistar Institute (/ˈwɪstɑːr/) is an independent, nonprofit research institution in biomedical science with special focuses in oncology, immunology, infectious disease, and vaccine research. Located on Spruce Street in the University City section of Philadelphia, Wistar was founded in 1892 as a nonprofit institution to focus on biomedical research and training.

Since 1972, Wistar has been a National Cancer Institute (NCI)-designated cancer center, and in that time, the Institute has established itself as a well-regarded research nonprofit. The NCI gave Wistar the highest cancer center rating of "exceptional" in two consecutive cancer center grant renewals in 2013 and 2018. Additionally, the Institute was ranked in 2024 in the 1st percentile for Innovation by the SCImago Institution Ranking (SIR) and third in US Research Institutions by Heartland Forward.

== Research ==
=== Cancer Research ===
The Wistar Institute Cancer Center researches prevention, diagnosis and treatment of cancer. The center is organized in three research programs:

- The Gene Expression and Regulation Program, focusing on cancer genomics and epigenetics.
- The Immunology, Microenvironment and Metastasis Program, focusing on the roles of the tumor microenvironment and the immune system in tumor progression and therapy response.
- The Molecular and Cellular Oncogenesis Program, focusing on cancer signaling networks to improve cancer diagnosis and therapy.

Wistar also maintains one of the largest melanoma research programs in the U.S. outside the National Institutes of Health (NIH). The Institute's significant cancer research findings include the identification of genetic alterations linked to the development of blood cancer; development of the monoclonal antibody technology and its development for clinical use; discovery of molecular markers for non-invasive diagnostic tests for lung cancer and cutaneous T-cell lymphoma; and the establishment of a Wistar melanoma cell line repository.

=== Immunology and Vaccine Development ===
The Wistar Vaccine & Immunotherapy Center researches next-generation DNA-based technologies for prevention of infectious diseases — both viral and microbial — and for cancer immunotherapy.

The Institute's NIH-funded HIV-1 research program leads a consortium of several HIV investigators nationwide who develop and test combinations of novel immunotherapies in clinical trials.

Wistar's vaccine and immune research has resulted in the development of several significant vaccines:

- Rubella Vaccine: A vaccine for rubella was developed in 1969 at Wistar and has been administered in the U.S. as part of the measles, mumps and rubella (MMR) combination vaccine since the 1970s. The rubella vaccination campaign resulted in the disease's eradication in the US by 2004.
- Rabies Vaccines: Wistar researchers developed a human rabies vaccine in the 1970s and a rabies vaccine for wildlife in the 1990s; both vaccines have decreased the incidence of rabies infection in humans and wildlife, respectively.
- Rotavirus Vaccine: Wistar scientists co-created a rotavirus vaccine that was licensed by the Food and Drug Administration in 2016. The vaccine is routinely administered in the U.S. and around the world to prevent diarrheal disease in children.
- Powassan Vaccine Candidate: Wistar created a vaccine candidate against Powassan virus.

== Education and training ==
The Institute offers several programs for education and training, including a postdoctoral program; joint graduate programs with select partnering institutions; student apprenticeships in biomedical research technician work; high school fellowships in biomedical research; and the Biomedical Technician Training Program, a joint venture between Wistar and the Community College of Philadelphia that trains community college students for work as research assistants and technicians.

== History ==
=== Beginnings ===
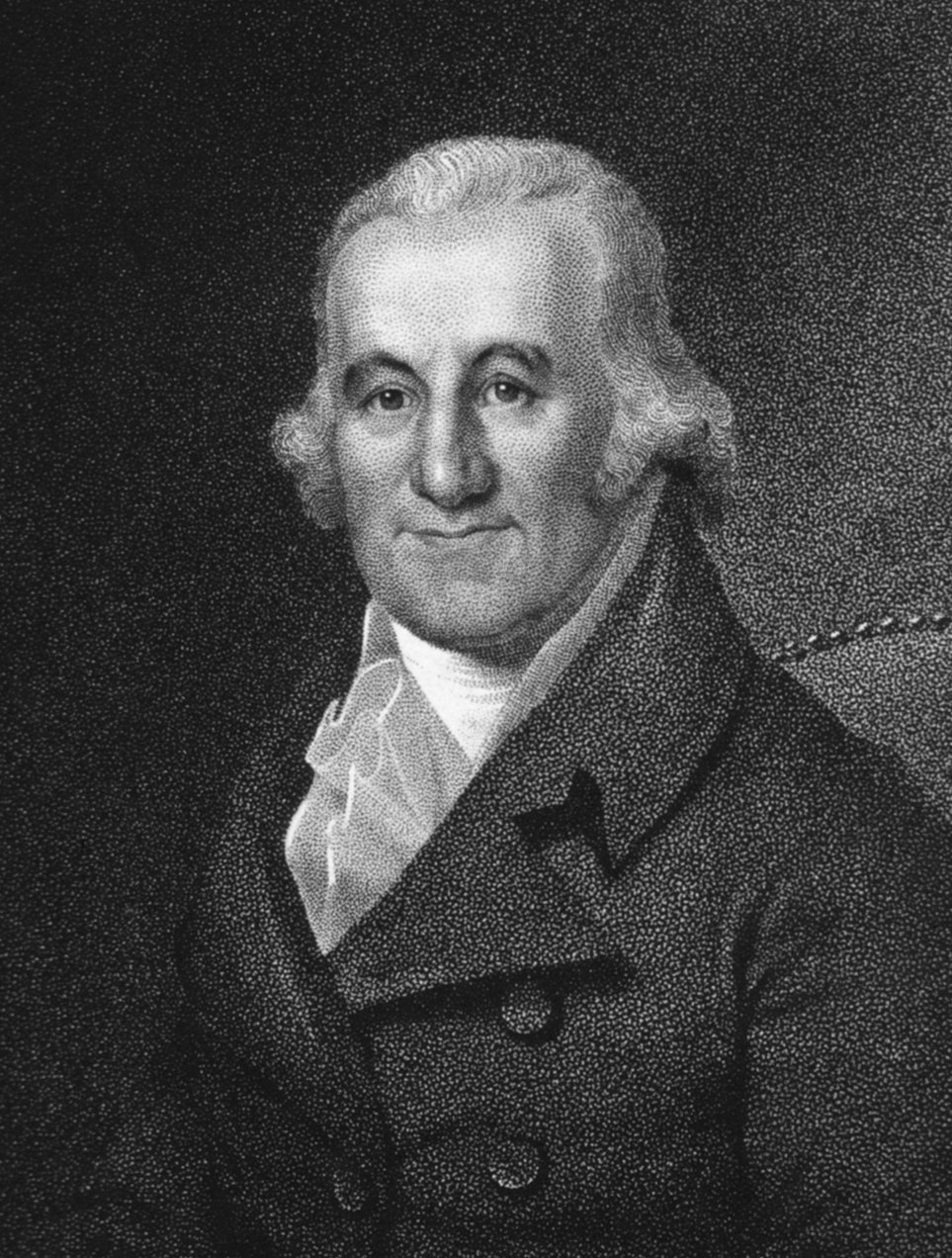
Dr. Caspar Wistar

The Wistar Institute of Anatomy and Biology was named for Dr. Caspar Wistar (1761-1818), a prominent Philadelphia physician and chair of the anatomy department at the University of Pennsylvania. He wrote and published the first American textbook on anatomy—A System of Anatomy: Volume 1 (1811), Volume 2 (1814).

To augment his medical lectures and illustrate comparative anatomy, Dr. Wistar began collecting dried, wax-injected, preserved human specimens. Two years prior to his death in 1818, he gave the collection to Dr. William Edmonds Horner, another Philadelphia physician. Dr. Horner expanded the collection, which became known as the Wistar and Horner Museum.

The collection was further expanded by its next curator, Dr. Joseph Leidy, who added animal specimens, fossils and anthropological samples. By the late 1880s, the collection was beginning to show signs of neglect and wear, a problem compounded by a fire in Logan Hall, the University of Pennsylvania building that housed the museum. The Wistar Institute contains the remaining twenty-two brains of eminent physicians and scientists collected by the American Anthropometric Society.

==== Isaac Jones Wistar ====
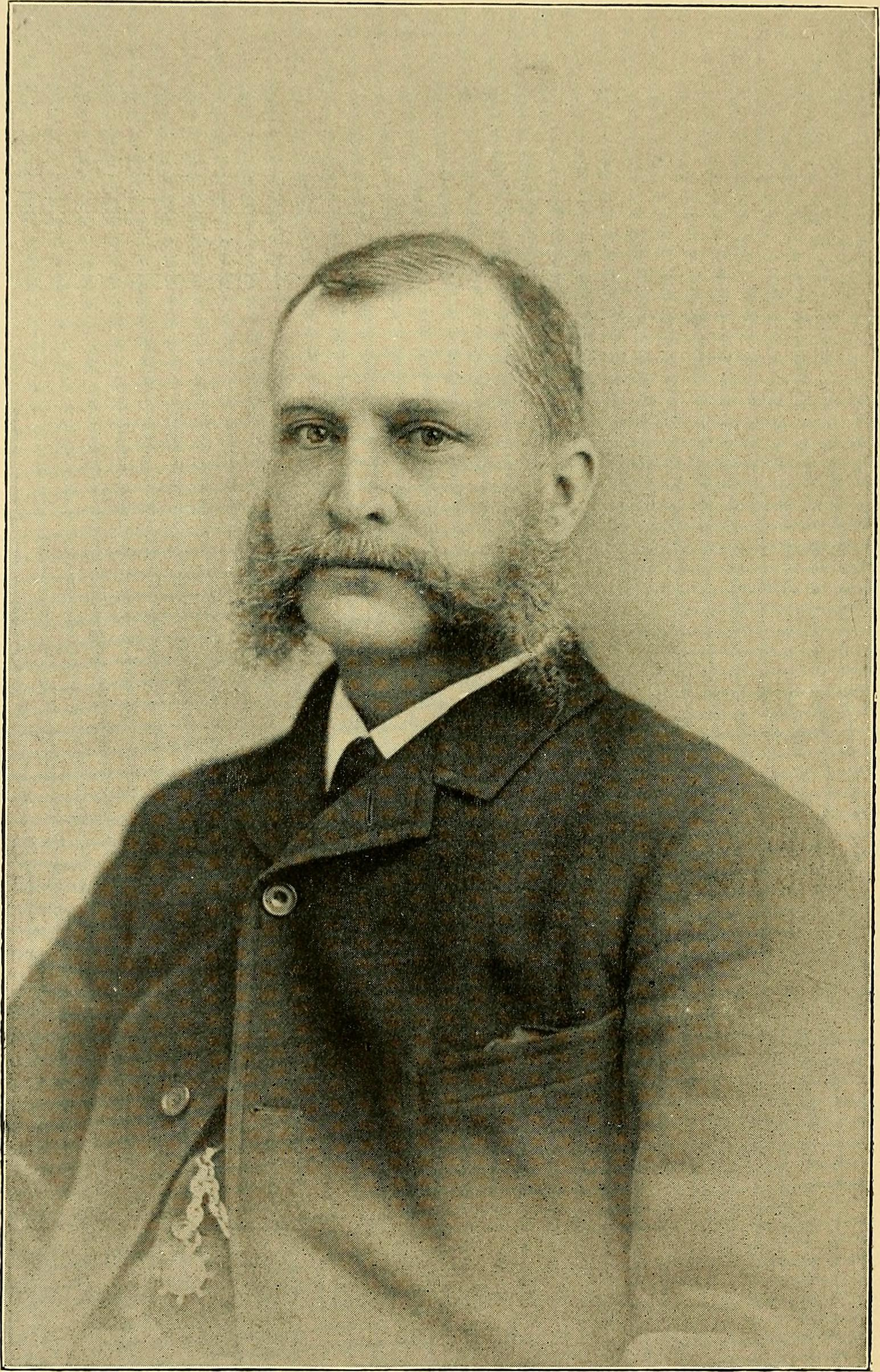
Gen. Isaac Jones Wistar, c.1898

Dr. Wistar's great-nephew, Isaac Jones Wistar (1827-1905) — a prominent Philadelphia lawyer, Civil War brigadier general, and vice president of the Pennsylvania Railroad — founded The Wistar Institute of Anatomy and Biology in 1892. Approached by the University of Pennsylvania about donating to preserve the Wistar and Horner Museum, Gen. Wistar instead decided to fund a new building. His vision soon expanded to create the Wistar Institute, which would sponsor and publish new medical research and "any other work for the increase of original scientific knowledge."

A plot of land was secured, and Wistar hired architects George W. and William G. Hewitt to design the museum/laboratory. The building was dedicated on May 21, 1894. Dr. Horace Jayne served as its director from January 1894 to December 1903.

A bronze bust of Gen. Wistar by sculptor Samuel Murray is exhibited in the Institute's museum. The Institute's original building is a National Register of Historic Places contributing property in the University of Pennsylvania Campus Historic District, and the Pennsylvania Historical and Museum Commission recognized the Wistar Institute of Anatomy and Biology with a state historic marker in 2007.

=== 20th century ===
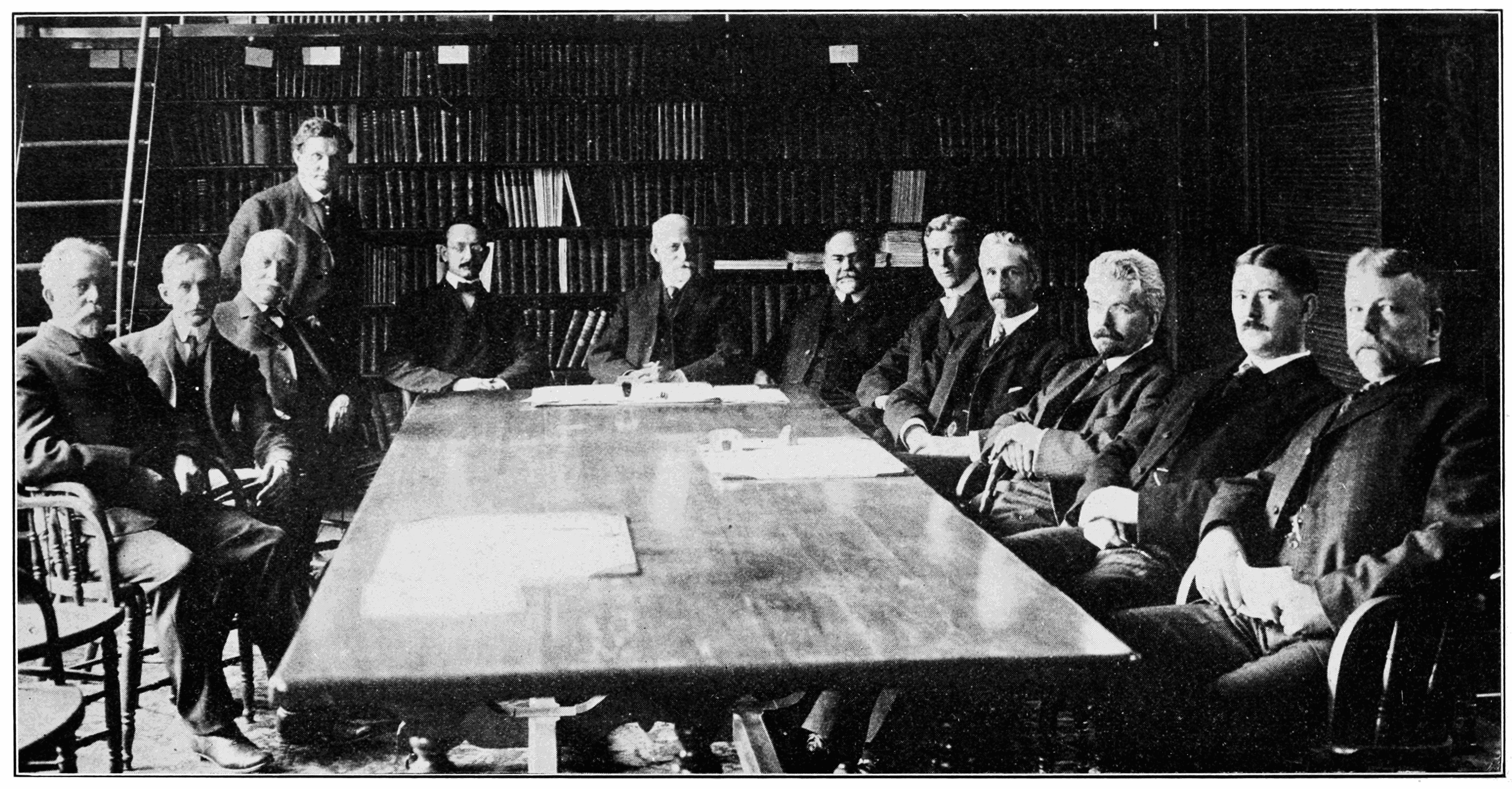
1905 conference in the Wistar Institute Library

At the beginning of the 20th century, The Wistar Institute began to pursue new biomedical research, particularly experimental and investigative biology, under the leadership of Milton Greenman, M.D., and Henry Donaldson, Ph.D.

Between 1908 and 1910, Wistar scientist Helen Dean King, Ph.D., developed and bred the Wistar rat, the first standardized laboratory animal model from which more than half of all laboratory rats today are thought to be descended. The Institute also began publishing scientific journals under the Wistar Press. Between 1905 and 1925, Wistar scientists published 227 original scientific papers, and by 1925, the Institute had solidified its reputation as a center of American biology.

The modern era of Wistar began under the leadership of virologist and immunologist Hilary Koprowski, M.D., who served as director from 1957 to 1991. During his tenure, the Institute established its respected vaccine and cancer research programs. Wistar's significant advancements from this period include the creation of the WI-38 cell line by Leonard Hayflick, Ph.D., and Paul S. Moorhead, Ph.D.; their cell line was used to develop several vaccines both at the Institute and in laboratories around the world.

By the 1970s, Wistar was devoting major effort and financial resources to cancer research, and in 1972, the National Cancer Institute designated Wistar an official NCI Cancer Center in basic research. A new cancer research building and a vivarium were erected in 1975. The Wistar press closed in 1979.

Wistar continued its research as an official NCI Cancer Center after receiving its designation; in the 1980s, Institute scientists were among the first to develop antiviral and antitumor monoclonal antibodies that have been widely used as tools for basic research and to develop therapies against cancer and immune diseases.

=== 21st century ===
The Robert and Penny Fox Research Tower, the newest major addition to the Wistar research facility, was completed in 2014. The expansion added nearly 90,000 square feet of modern laboratory space to the Institute with a more collaborative lab design. As of 2023, the Wistar Institute employs 31 Principal Investigators and receives over $25 million in NIH funding.

In July 2024, the Wistar Institute announced a $24 million investment to open a center dedicated to HIV research.

== Notable members ==
- Dario Altieri, M.D.: an expert in cancer research who characterized the survivin gene and its role in cancer. Since 2010, he has served as the Director of Wistar's Ellen and Ronald Caplan Cancer Center. He was named President and CEO of Wistar in 2015, an office he still executes at the time of this writing.
- H. Fred Clark, D.V.M., Ph.D.: a veterinarian and vaccine expert and worked at Wistar from 1968 to 1992. He was one of the scientists who developed the rotavirus vaccine.
- Carlo M. Croce, M.D.: an oncologist noted for his research on the genetic mechanisms of cancer. During his time at Wistar from 1970 to 1988, he cloned and characterized the B-Cell lymphoma (BCL2) gene and identified chromosomal translocations involved in blood cancer
- Peter C. Doherty, Ph.D.: a veterinary surgeon and researcher in the field of medicine, he worked at the Institute from 1975 to 1982 and is currently an emeritus member of the Institute's Board of Trustees. Doherty received the Nobel Prize in Physiology or Medicine jointly with Rolf M. Zinkernagel in 1996.
- Leonard Hayflick, Ph.D.: a biologist and aging expert who worked at Wistar from 1958 to 1968. He discovered that normal human cells divide a limited number of times in vitro, a phenomenon known as the Hayflick limit. The WI-38 cell strain he developed at the Institute with Paul S. Moorhead, Ph.D., became the substrate for the production of many human virus vaccines.
- Helen Dean King, Ph.D.: a biologist and the first woman research professor at Wistar and one of the first in the U.S. A faculty member from 1909 to 1950, Dr. King researched the genetics of inbreeding and sex determination. She was instrumental in creating and breeding the Wistar rat, the first standardized laboratory animal model.
- Hilary Koprowski, M.D.: a virologist, immunologist and inventor of the world's first effective live polio vaccine. He served as director of the institute from 1957 to 1991 and obtained international recognition for Wistar's vaccine development and cancer research. He held the title of Professor Laureate at Wistar and served on its Board of Trustees.
- David Kritchevsky, Ph.D.: a biochemist and expert in human nutrition who worked at Wistar for five decades starting in 1957. He generated a vast amount of scientific knowledge on the role of lipids in atherosclerosis and authored the influential textbook Cholesterol, which explores the biologic functions of cholesterol in great detail.
- Gerd Maul, Ph.D., a scientist and electron microscopy expert. He discovered the nuclear dots, structures within the nucleus of mammalian cells that become abundant in response to stress. He worked at Wistar from 1973 to his death in 2010.
- Ruth Patrick, Ph.D.: a botanist and water environment researcher specializing in diatoms and freshwater ecology who developed ways to measure the health of freshwater ecosystems and established several research facilities. Dr. Patrick served on Wistar's Board of Trustees from 1975 to 2008 and remained an emeritus member until her death.
- Stanley Plotkin, M.D.: a physician who played a pivotal role in discovering a vaccine against the rubella virus in the 1960s while working at Wistar. Plotkin was a member of Wistar's active research faculty from 1960 to 1991.
- Giorgio Trinchieri, M.D.: an immunologist who worked at Wistar from 1979 to 1999 and served as the Immunology Program chairman; while at the Institute, he discovered the cytokine Interleukin-12 (IL-12). He is currently the chief of the NCI Laboratory of Integrative Cancer Immunology.
- Tadeusz J. Wiktor, D.V.M.: a veterinarian and rabies expert. He was part of Wistar's faculty from 1961 until his death in 1986 and served as the head of the Institute's rabies unit; while at Wistar, he helped develop the human vaccine against rabies.
