= Valero (name) =

- Gender: Male

Origin
- Origin: Latin nomen Valerius
- Region of origin: Italy

Valero is a surname and a masculine given name. Notable people with the name are as follows:

== Surname ==
- Aaron Valero (1913–2000), Israeli physician and educator
- Addy Valero (died 2020), Venezuelan politician
- Antonio Valero, multiple people
- Antonio Valero de Bernabe (1790–1863), Puerto Rican military leader
- Art Valero (born 1958), American football coach
- Bodil Valero (born 1958), Swedish politician
- Borja Valero (born 1985), Spanish football player
- Carlos Gimeno Valero (born 2001), Spanish tennis player
- Carmen Valero (1955–2024), Spanish athlete
- Cristina Torrens Valero (born 1974), Spanish tennis player
- Cristóbal Valero (1707–1789), Spanish painter and presbyter
- Damien Valero (born 1965), French artist and academic
- David Valero (born 1988), Spanish cyclist
- Dora Martínez Valero (born 1976), Mexican politician
- Edwin Valero (1981–2010), Venezuelan professional boxer
- Elisa Valero (born 1971), Spanish architect and academic
- Elisabet Escursell Valero (born 1996), Spanish cyclist
- Haim Aharon Valero (1846–1923), banker and first non-rabbi to lead the Sephardi Kollel in Jerusalem
- Francisco Valero (1906–1982), Mexican fencer
- Jacob Valero (1813–1874), Jewish banker from Jerusalem
- Jorge Valero (born 1946), Venezuelan historian and ambassador
- José Sótero Valero Ruz (1936–2012), Venezuelan Catholic bishop
- Julien Valéro (born 1984), French football player
- Julieta Valero (born 1971), Spanish poet
- Maria Valero (born 1991), Venezuelan volleyball player
- Mateo Valero (born 1952), Spanish computer architect
- Óscar Valero (born 1985), Spanish football player
- Roberto Valero (1955–1994), Cuban poet and novelist
- Roque Valero (born 1974), Venezuelan singer, actor and politician
- Rosemary Valero-O'Connell (born 1994), American illustrator and cartoonist
- Thierry Valéro, French rugby player
- Xavi Valero (born 1973), Spanish football goalkeeper
- Ximena Valero (born 1977), Mexican fashion designer

== Given name ==
- Valerius of Saragossa (d. 315 AD), bishop and Catholic saint
- Valero Iriarte (c. 1680–c. 1753), Spanish Baroque painter
- Valero Rivera Folch (born 1985), Spanish handball player
- Valero Rivera López (born 1953), Spanish handball player
- Valero Serer (1932–2022), Spanish football player

== See also ==
- Marquess of Valero, title of nobility held by Baltasar de Zúñiga, 1st Duke of Arión
- Valero
