= Children's Medical Safety Research Institute =

American anti-vaccination group

The Children's Medical Safety Research Institute (CMSRI) was a United States based anti-vaccination group which funded a number of pseudoscientific studies, notably by Christopher Shaw of the University of British Columbia, and his collaborator Lucija Tomljenovic, and by Christopher Exley of Keele University, which purport to link aluminium in vaccines to autism. The studies have been rejected by the World Health Organization and some have been retracted. A claimed "vaccinated vs. unvaccinated" cohort study has also been debunked.

The claimed link between vaccines and autism has been extensively investigated and shown to be false. The scientific consensus is that there is no relationship, causal or otherwise, between vaccines and the incidence of autism, and vaccine ingredients do not cause autism.

== History ==
The group was founded by Claire Dwoskin and funded by her and her husband Albert via their Dwoskin Family Foundation. It was wound up in 2018 citing the Dwoskins' divorce. Albert Dwoskin repudiated the group's activities, saying: "After seeing a great deal of evidence, I have concluded that concerns about the safety of vaccination are unfounded [...] The best way to protect children is to make sure they have all their vaccinations as recommended by scientists, doctors and other healthcare professionals."

Exley initially declared no conflict of interest despite being funded by CMSRI, but a formal correction was issued in November 2019. Following the winding up of CSMRI, Exley also lost funding from the UK's research councils, and was blocked from raising funds via GoFundMe citing a policy against use of the platform for anti-vaccination activism.

Controversial Israeli immunologist Yehuda Shoenfeld, originator of the disproven Autoimmune/inflammatory syndrome induced by adjuvants hypothesis, served on the group's scientific review board.
