= Eitan Okun =

Israeli neuroimmunologist

- איתן אוקון
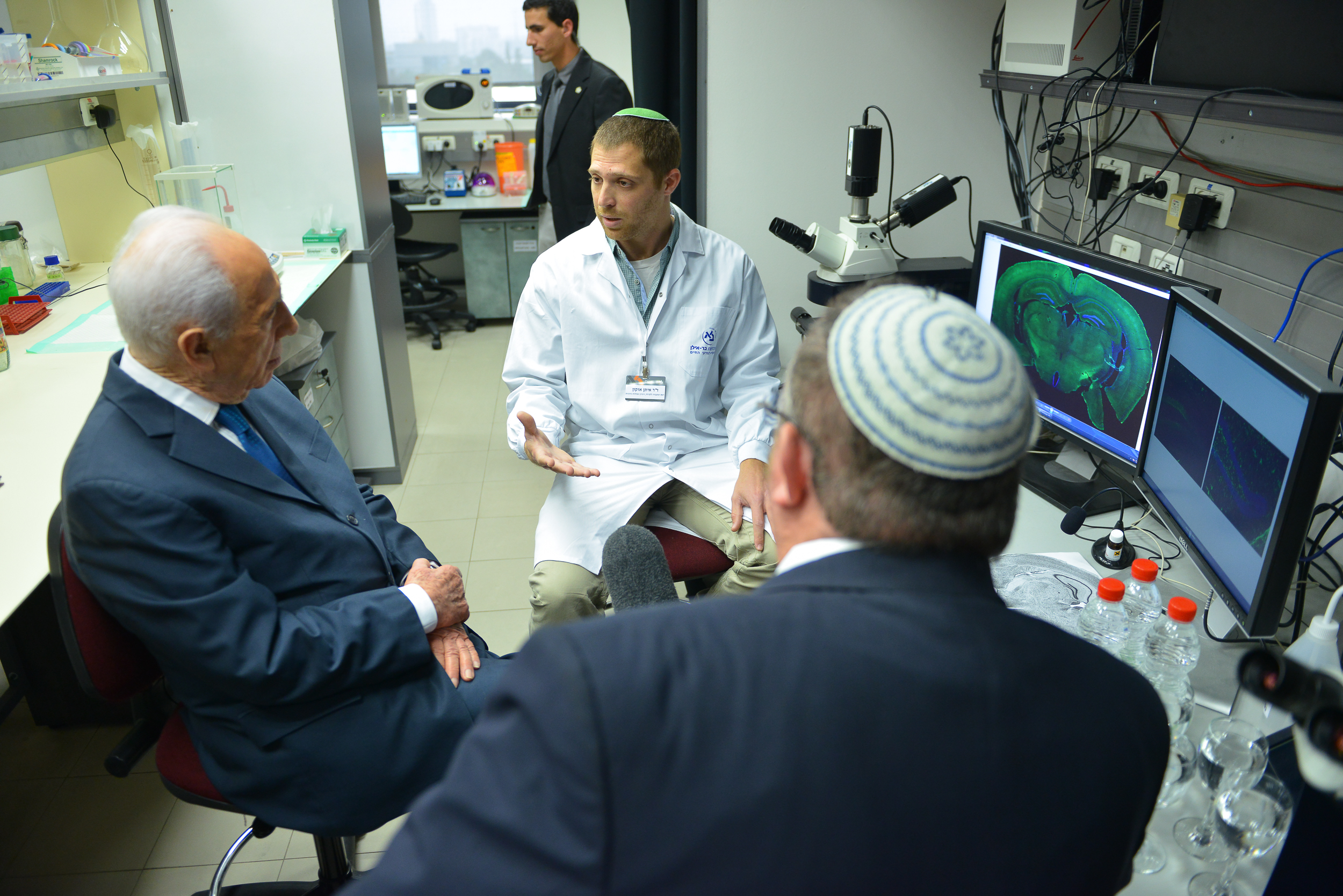
- Okun hosts Israeli President Shimon Peres in his laboratory
- Born: 1978 (age 47–48)
- Citizenship: Israel
- Education: Professor
- Alma mater: Bar-Ilan University
- Occupation: neuroimmunologist

Eitan Okun (Hebrew: איתן אוקון; born in 1978) is an Israeli neuroimmunologist, a professor at Bar-Ilan University.

== Education ==
Eitan Okun received his bachelor's degree in biology in 2003, his Master's in Immunology in 2004, and his Doctorate in Immunology in 2007, all from Bar-Ilan University. From 2007 to 2011, he was a post-doctoral fellow in Mark Mattson’s Neuroscience lab at the National institute on Aging, National Institutes of Health in Baltimore, Maryland.

== Career ==
In August 2011, Okun was appointed to head the Paul Feder Alzheimer’s disease research laboratory, and as a senior lecturer in the Goodman Faculty of Life Sciences at Bar-Ilan University, where he is also affiliated with the Gonda Multidisciplinary Brain Research Center. In February 2017, he was promoted to associate professor. His research focuses on Alzheimer's disease, and how cells of the immune system communicate with the brain during aging, in people with Alzheimer's disease, and individuals with Down syndrome. Another research focus is the connection between pregnancy with a Down syndrome fetus and the increased risk of cognitive decline in the mother.

Okun is a Full Professor at Bar-Ilan University, where his full title is Vice Dean for Research Resources Development at the Mina and Everard Goodman Faculty of Life Sciences. He continues to lead the Paul Feder Alzheimer's Disease Research Laboratory and serves as Vice Dean for Research Resources Development in the Goodman Faculty of Life Sciences.

In December 2022, he was appointed as co-editor-in-chief of the journal Neuromolecular Medicine.

== Personal life ==
Eitan Okun is married to Sarit, and they have four daughters and a son. Until October 7, They lived in Kibbutz Alumim near the Gaza Strip, where Sarit's parents are among the founders.

On 7 October 2023, with the start of the Hamas-led attack on Israel at 6:30 AM, Sarit and their children took shelter in their home's sheltered room, while Eitan, as part of the kibbutz's emergency response team, went out to combat the dozens of militants who had infiltrated the area of the kibbutz and its surroundings. Only after five hours of fighting did a reinforcement team from the Masada unit arrive, followed by forces from Yahalom and the Paratroopers Brigade. Okun's combat in the battle of Alumim ended at 10:30 PM.

On September 2024, Prof. Okun received the Katz prize in recognition of exceptional leadership, courage, responsibility, and service during circumstances of profound personal and community crisis: “The Prize committee found Prof. Eitan Okun worthy of the 2024 Katz Prize, for being an example of mutual responsibility, heroism and self-sacrifice in the Iron Swords war, thanks to his setting out to defend Kibbutz Alumim during the Iron Swords war; his courageous participation in the war; and his involvement in the containment, defense and evacuation which served as a model for the members of the emergency response squad and citizens who volunteered to defend and stand in the breach.”
