= Ram Reifen =

Israeli scholar (born 1954)

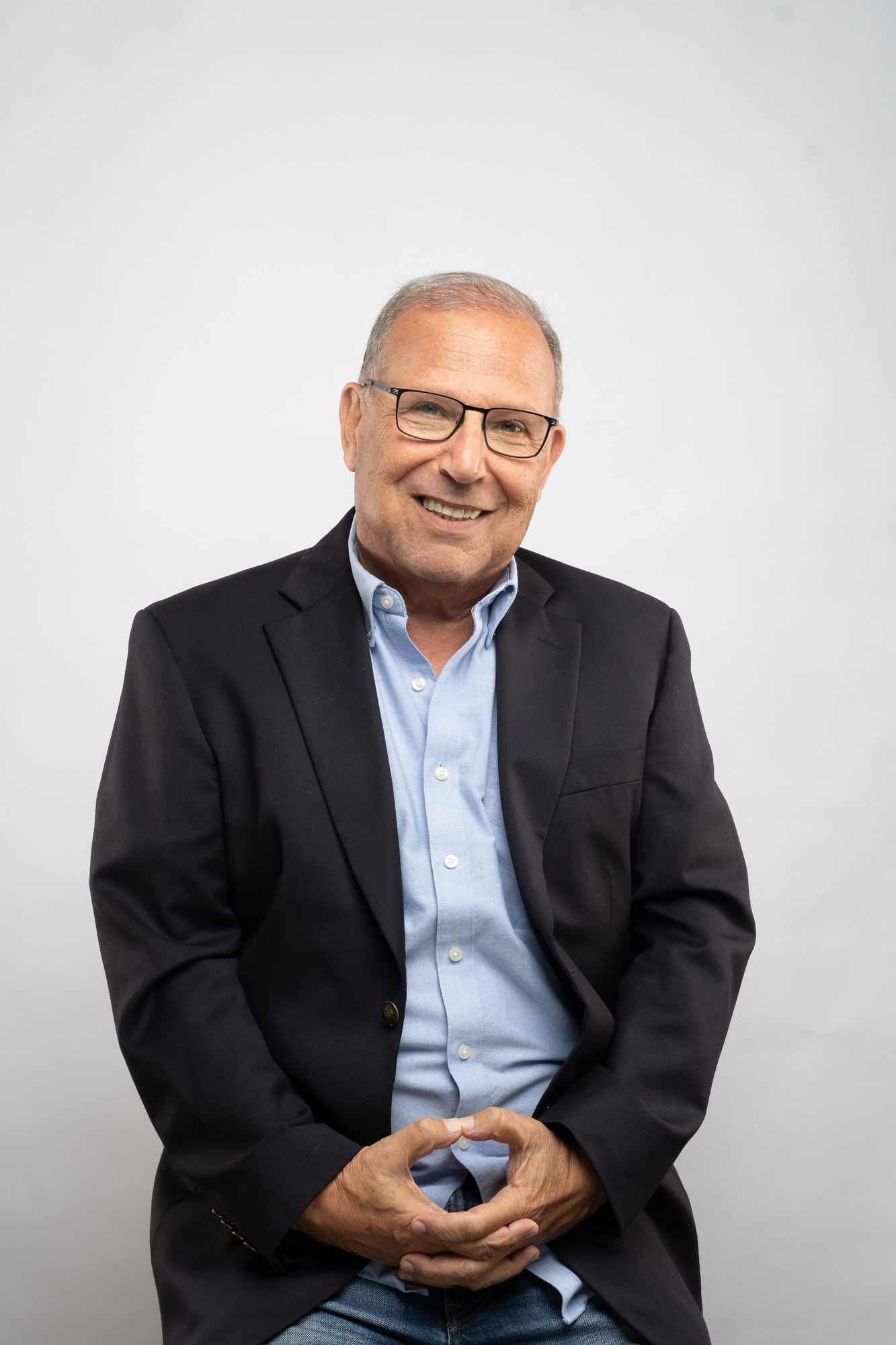
Ram Reifen

Ram Reifen (Hebrew: רם רייפן; born April 26, 1954) is an Israeli scholar, a pediatric gastroenterologist, a professor of Human Nutrition, at the Hebrew University of Jerusalem's Robert H Smith Faculty of Agriculture, Food, and Environment.

== Education ==
Reifen was born and raised in Rehovot, Israel, to Chana and Yaakov Reifen. Reifen received his MD in 1982 and was certified as a pediatrician in 1989. In 1994, Reifen received a Board Certification in Pediatric Gastroenterology and Nutrition from the Israel Medical Association.

== Career ==
In 1994, Reifen joined as a lecturer at the School of Nutritional Sciences, Faculty of Agricultural Food and Environmental Quality Sciences, Hebrew University of Jerusalem at Rehovot and became a full professor status in 2012.

In 2005, Reifen Founded and served as an Academic Director of the M.Sc. Nutritional Sciences Program for international students. Since 2014, Reifen has been the Director of the Research Centre for Nutrigenomics and Functional Foods at the Hebrew University of Jerusalem.

== ChickP ==
After conducting a 15-year research on chickpeas, Reifen developed a process for extracting the chickpea protein. This process became a registered patent belonging to Reifen and the Hebrew University and a business venture that later developed into ChickP Protein Ltd, a company managed by Reifen. ChickP Protein Ltd is currently marketing an Isolate protein powder used in many commercial planet-based products replacement for Meat, cheese, fish and eggs.
