= Christopher Shaw (neuroscientist) =

Canadian neuroscientist and professor of ophthalmology

- Education: B.S. (University of California Irvine, 1971); M.S. (Hebrew University of Jerusalem, 1974); Ph.D. (Hebrew University of Jerusalem, 1979)
- Scientific career
- Fields: Neuroscience
- Institutions: University of British Columbia
- Thesis: Electrophysiological studies of after-potentials in invertebrate photoreceptors (1979)

Christopher Ariel Shaw is a Canadian neuroscientist and professor of ophthalmology at the University of British Columbia.

== Vaccine research ==
Shaw has done controversial research on the alleged adverse effects of vaccines, including publishing two 2011 reports about the effect of aluminum adjuvants in vaccines. The World Health Organization's Global Advisory Committee on Vaccine Safety criticized the two 2011 reports, calling them "seriously flawed". The Committee wrote: "The core argument made in these studies is based on ecological comparisons of aluminium content in vaccines and rates of autism spectrum disorders in several countries. In general, ecological studies cannot be used to assert a causal association because they do not link exposure to outcome in individuals, and only make correlations of exposure and outcomes on population averages". Shaw has received nearly $900,000 in research funding from the Dwoskin Family Foundation and the Katlyn Fox Foundation, both of which question the safety of vaccines. The University of British Columbia and numerous experts said there is no problem with the source of this funding, noting that many researchers accept money from pharmaceutical companies and other entities.

In October 2017, Shaw and his colleague, Lucija Tomljenovic, announced that they were retracting a paper they had co-authored in the Journal of Inorganic Biochemistry, claiming to find that aluminum in vaccines caused symptoms "consistent with those in autism" in mice, after multiple other researchers had criticized the underlying data as invalid or falsified. After seeing some of these criticisms on PubPeer, Shaw and his lab reanalyzed the figures that had been criticized, and requested a retraction from the journal, saying "It appears as if some of the images in mostly what were non-significant results had been flipped. We don't know why, we don't know how … but there was a screw-up, there's no question about that." In response to this retraction, the University of British Columbia issued a statement defending academic freedom as well as Shaw's academic integrity.

In October 2017, Shaw and Tomljenovic and several other coauthors published an article in Open Access Library Journal, published by Scientific Research Publishing, a predatory open access publisher, about a tetanus vaccine that had been used in Kenya in 2014. The authors withdrew the article, then published it again in the same journal.

Shaw was on the Scientific Advisory Board of the anti-vaccine Children's Medical Safety Research Institute, founded and funded by Claire Dwoskin. Dwoskin has used Shaw's studies, conducted at the University of British Columbia, as supposed evidence that vaccines cause autism. Shaw is the senior editor of the International Journal of Vaccine Theory, Practice, and Research, an anti-vaccine journal.

== Publications ==
=== Books ===
- Christopher Shaw; Jill C. McEachern (2001). Toward a Theory of Neuroplasticity. Psychology Press. p. 468. ISBN 978-1-84169-021-6.
- Shaw, Christopher (2008). Five Ring Circus: Myths and Realities of the Olympic Games. New Society Publishers. ISBN 978-0-86571-592-9.
- Shaw, Christopher (2017). Neural Dynamics of Neurological Disease. Wiley-Blackwell. ISBN 978-1-118-63457-8.
- Shaw, Christopher (2018). "Aluminum as a CNS and immune system toxin across the lifespan". In Neurotoxicity of Aluminum. Qiao Niu (Editor). Springer Publishing.
- Shaw, Christopher A. (August 31, 2021). Dispatches from the Vaccine Wars: Fighting for Human Freedom During the Great Reset. Skyhorse Publishing. ISBN 978-1-5107-5850-6.
- Pelech, Steven; Shaw, Christopher A. (November 19, 2024). Down the COVID-19 Rabbit Hole: Independent Scientists and Physicians Unmask the Pandemic. Skyhorse Publishing. ISBN 978-1-5107-7959-4.
- Pelech, Steven; Shaw, Christopher A. (2025). COVID-19 Pandemonium: A Pandemic of Ignorance, Fear and Greed: The Capture of Our Institutions. Ekstasis Editions. ISBN 978-1-77171-584-3.

=== Research articles ===
- Petrik, M; Wong, MC; Tabata, RC; Garry, RF; Shaw, CA (February 2007). "Aluminum adjuvant linked to gulf war illness induces motor neuron death in mice". Neuromolecular Medicine. 9 (1): 83–100. doi:10.1385/NMM:9:1:83. PMID 17114826. S2CID 15839936.
- Lee, G.; Chu, T.; Shaw, C. A. (2009). "The primary locus of motor neuron death in an ALS–PDC mouse model". NeuroReport. 20 (14): 1284–9. doi:10.1097/WNR.0b013e32833037ae. PMC 2819814. PMID 19633581.
- Shaw, CA; Petrik, MS (2009). "Aluminum hydroxide injections lead to motor deficits and motor neuron degeneration". Journal of Inorganic Biochemistry. 103 (11): 1555–62. doi:10.1016/j.jinorgbio.2009.05.019. PMC 2819810. PMID 19740540.
- Crépeaux, Guillemette; Eidi, Housam; David, Marie-Odilem; Baba-Amer, Yasmine; Tzavara, Eleni; Giros, Bruno; Authier, François-Jérôme; Exley, Christopher; Shaw, Christopher A.; Cadusseau, Josette; Gherardi, Romain K. (2017). "Non-linear dose-response of aluminium hydroxide adjuvant particles: Selective low dose neurotoxicity" (PDF). Toxicology. 375: 48–57. Bibcode:2017Toxgy.375...48C. doi:10.1016/j.tox.2016.11.018. PMID 27908630.
- Inbar, R; Weiss, R; Tomljenovic, L; Arango, MT; Deri, Y; Shaw, CA; Chapman, J; Blank, M; Shoenfeld, Y (2017). "Behavioral abnormalities in female mice following administration of aluminum adjuvants and the human papillomavirus (HPV) vaccine Gardasil". Immunologic Research. 65 (1): 136–149. doi:10.1007/s12026-016-8826-6. PMID 27421722. S2CID 3337271.
- Sheth, Sneha K.S.; Li, Yongling; Shaw, Christopher A. (2018). "Is exposure to aluminium adjuvants associated with social impairments in mice? A pilot study". Journal of Inorganic Biochemistry. 181: 96–103. doi:10.1016/j.jinorgbio.2017.11.012. PMID 29221615.

=== Retracted articles ===
- Crépeaux, Guillemette; Exley, Christopher; Shaw, Christopher A.; Gherardi, Romain K. (2017). "RETRACTED: Letter to the editor". Toxicology. 390: 159. Bibcode:2017Toxgy.390..159C. doi:10.1016/j.tox.2017.09.010. PMID 28928034. (Retracted, see doi:10.1016/j.tox.2018.03.005, PMID 29576342, Retraction Watch)
- Li, Dan; Tomljenovic, Lucija; Li, Yongling; Shaw, Christopher A. (December 2017). "RETRACTED: Subcutaneous injections of aluminum at vaccine adjuvant levels activate innate immune genes in mouse brain that are homologous with biomarkers of autism". Journal of Inorganic Biochemistry. 177: 39–54. doi:10.1016/j.jinorgbio.2017.08.035. PMID 28923356. (Retracted, see doi:10.1016/j.jinorgbio.2017.08, PMID 29269133, Retraction Watch)
- Inbar, Rotem; Weiss, Ronen; Tomljenovic, Lucija; Arango, Maria-Teresa; Deri, Yael; Shaw, Christopher A.; Chapman, Joab; Blank, Miri; Shoenfeld, Yehuda (January 2016). "WITHDRAWN: Behavioral abnormalities in young female mice following administration of aluminum adjuvants and the human papillomavirus (HPV) vaccine Gardasil". Vaccine. doi:10.1016/j.vaccine.2015.12.067. PMID 26778424. (Retracted, see doi:10.1016/j.vaccine.2015.12.067, PMID 26778424, Retraction Watch)

=== Review articles ===
- Shaw, C. A.; Tomljenovic, L. (2013). "Aluminum in the central nervous system (CNS): Toxicity in humans and animals, vaccine adjuvants, and autoimmunity". Immunologic Research. 56 (2–3): 304–316. doi:10.1007/s12026-013-8403-1. PMID 23609067. S2CID 21760451.
- Shaw, C. A.; Seneff, S.; Kette, S. D.; Tomljenovic, L.; Oller Jr, J. W.; Davidson, R. M. (2014). "Aluminum-Induced Entropy in Biological Systems: Implications for Neurological Disease". Journal of Toxicology. 2014 491316. doi:10.1155/2014/491316. PMC 4202242. PMID 25349607.
