= Aaron Valero =

Israeli physician (1913–2000)

- אהרון ואלרו
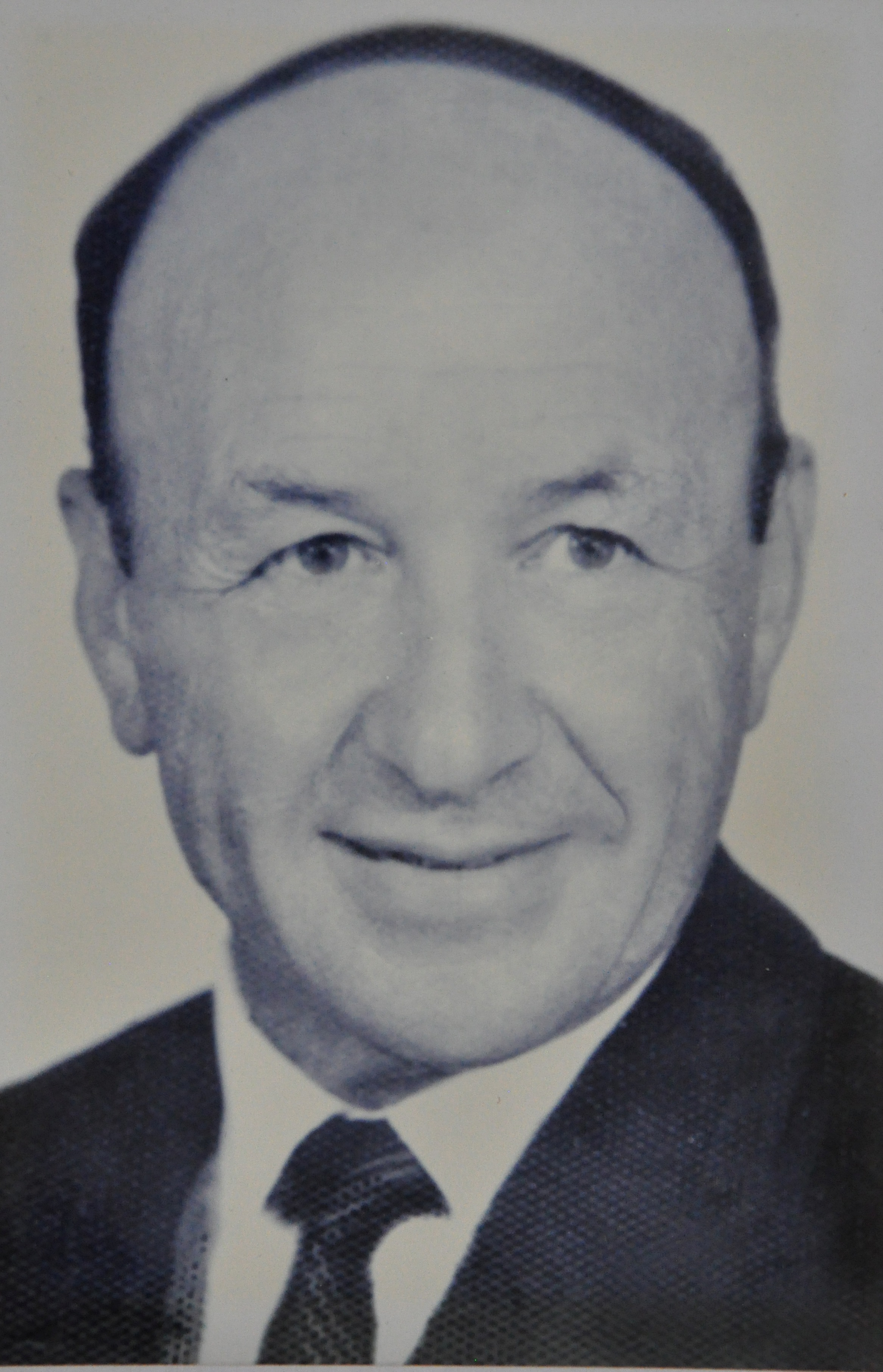
- Born: 1913; Jerusalem, Palestine, Ottoman Empire
- Died: 2000 (aged 86–87); Haifa, Israel
- Scientific career
- Fields: Medicine

Aaron Valero (Hebrew: אהרון ואלרו; 1913–2000) was an Israeli physician and educator who helped establish hospitals and medical schools, authored medical publications and contributed greatly to the advancement of medical education in Israel in the latter half of the 20th century.

== Main achievements ==
Valero was the first to recognise and describe the outbreak of bubonic plague in Palestine ("Streptomycin in Bubonic Plague", British Medical Journal, 29 May 1948, pp. 1026–1027). A year later, he observed the outbreak of Rocky Mountain spotted fever in Palestine (Harefuah, Vol. XXXVI, No 9,36, pp. 1–3, 1 May 1949). In his 1953 publication he presented the first reported case of human Ornithosis in the Middle East ("Human Ornithosis in Israel", Harefuah, Vol XLV, No. 5, 1 September 1953).

Valero invented an electronic device capable of recording arterial pulsations and the mechanical events of the heart without actually making contact with the chest wall. This device was first described in the American Journal of Cardiology, 19 February 1967, Vol. 19, pp. 224–230 and in subsequent publications (list below).

== Biography ==
Aaron Valero was born in Jerusalem to a distinguished Sephardic family which had settled in Palestine in the early 19th century. His grandfather, Chaim Aharon Valero, was a prominent Jerusalem banker. Valero's great-grandfather, Jacob Valero, established the first bank in Palestine. Yaakov Shaul Elyashar, the father of Valero's great-great-grandmother, had become Chief Rabbi of the Land of Israel (Palestine) in 1893.

Valero attended the Hebrew Gymnasium in Jerusalem (after 1928 known as the Rehavia Gymnasium), and received an MB ChB degree from Birmingham University in England in 1938.

During World War II Valero joined the British Army, serving from 1941 to 1946. He served as a military physician in East Africa, the Persian Gulf, North Africa, and Iraq. He was discharged with the rank of Major. During the 1948 Arab-Israeli War, he served as a regimental physician in the Israel Defense Forces on the northern front.

He opened the Department of Internal Medicine at Rambam Hospital. He also worked at the Israeli Government's Poriya Hospital. He was one of the founders of the Bruce Rappaport Faculty of Medicine of the Technion in Haifa. and he was involved in Medical Education of the Faculty of Medicine at the Technion.

== Publications ==
=== Books ===
Valero authored two medical books:

- Clinical E.C.G., 1973, Technion Michlol publishing house
- Bedside Detection, 1980

=== Articles (partial list) ===
- Valero et al., "Focal Cardiography – An experimental Study in Dogs", Israel Journal of Medical Sciences, Jan–Feb 1969, Vol. 5, No. 1, pp. 13–22
- Valero, "Focal Displacement Cardiography for Bedside Detection of Myocardial Dyskinesis", The American Journal of Cardiology, April 1970, Vol 25. pp. 443–449
- Valero et al., "Effect of Exercise and Acclimatization on displacement apex Cardiogram in Normal Young Subjects", British Heart Journal January 1971, Vol. 33, No. 1, pp. 37–45
- Valero,"Atrial transport dysfunction in acute myocardial infarction", The American Journal of Cardiology, Volume 16, Issue 1, pp. 22–30

== Legacy ==
The Professor Aaron Valero Fund for the Advancement of Medical Education was established in memory of Dr. Valero. The fund holds and annual Prof. Aaron Valero Memorial Seminar on patient-physician relations, which focuses on Patient-Physician Relations.

== Bibliography ==
- Glass and Kark, "Sephardi Entrepreneurs in Jerusalem-The Valero Family 1800–1948" Gefen Publishing House, 2007.ISBN 978-965-229-396-1
- Kark and Glass, "The Valero Family: Seven Generations in Jerusalem, 1800–1949" Gefen Publishing House, 2005. ISBN 965-229-336-9
- Levy, "The History of Medicine in the Holy Land: 1799–1948", Hakibbutz Hameuchad Publishing House and B. Rappaport Faculty of Medicine, Technion – Israel Institute of Technology, Haifa, 1998. ISBN 965-02-0114-9
- Hurwich, "Military Medicine in Israel, the pre-state years, 1911–1948" Ministry of Defence Publishing House, 1977. ISBN 965-05-0896-1
- Technion – Israel Institute of Technology, Division of Public Affairs and Resource Development
- Kark, Ruth; B. Glass, Joseph (2004). "The Valero Family: Sephardi-Arab Relations in Ottoman and Mandatory Jerusalem". Jerusalem Quarterly (21): 27. doi:10.70190/jq.I21.p27.
