= Autoimmune/inflammatory syndrome induced by adjuvants =

Hypothesised autoimmune disorder

Autoimmune/inflammatory syndrome induced by adjuvants (ASIA), or Shoenfeld's syndrome, is a hypothesised autoimmune disorder proposed by Israeli immunologist Yehuda Shoenfeld in 2011. According to Shoenfeld, the syndrome is triggered by exposure to adjuvants and includes four conditions: "post-vaccination symptoms", macrophagic myofasciitis, Gulf war syndrome, sick building syndrome, and siliconosis. Shoenfeld has also named Sjögren's syndrome as potentially being another facet of ASIA. ASIA as an umbrella term has also been said to include: multiple chemical sensitivity, repetition stress injury, chronic fatigue syndrome/ myalgic encephalomyelitis, complex regional pain syndrome, and postural and orthostatic tachycardia syndrome.

Apart from the theoretical concept of ASIA, there no evidence for any causal relationship between adjuvant and autoimmune condition. A study of 18,000 people showed that there is no merit to the theory of autoimmune/inflammatory syndrome induced by adjuvants.

Shoenfeld alleges that the syndrome is caused by adjuvants such as silicone, tetramethylpentadecane, pristane, and aluminum. However, causality is difficult to prove because ASIA only occurs in a small fraction of patients exposed to these adjuvants. Additionally, proponents of this theory allege that the disorder can manifest anywhere from 2 days to 23 years after exposure.
