= Yehuda Shoenfeld =

Israeli physician

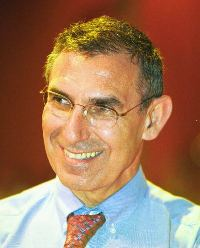
Yehuda Shoenfeld

An interview with Yehuda Shoenfeld on Autoimmune Syndrome induced by Adjuvants (ASIA)

Yehuda Shoenfeld (Hebrew: יהודה שינפלד; born February 14, 1948 in Topoľčany, Slovakia) is an Israeli physician and autoimmunity researcher.

== Biography ==
Yehuda Shoenfeld works at Sheba Medical Center in Tel HaShomer and the Sackler Faculty of Medicine at Tel-Aviv University. He studied at the Hebrew University of Jerusalem. He is the incumbent of the Laura Schwarz-Kipp Chair for Research of Autoimmune Diseases. Shoenfeld is the editor of two journals, Harefuah (Medicine) in Hebrew with English abstracts and Israel Medical Association Journal (IMAJ). He is co-editor-in-chief of Autoimmunity Reviews, and co-editor of the Journal of Autoimmunity, and member of the editorial board of the Clinical Reviews in Allergy & Immunology.

Shoenfeld, proposed a syndrome he calls Autoimmune Syndrome Induced by Adjuvants (ASIA), which aims to be an autoimmune response to vaccine adjuvants.

== Published works ==
He has published more than 2,000 papers. Also, he has authored and edited 40 books and contributed more than 350 chapters to various books, most recently Vaccines and Autoimmunity published by Wiley Blackwell. Prof. Shoenfeld is on the editorial board of 43 medical journals.

== Awards and recognition ==
Shoenfeld received the EULAR Prize (Austria, 2005). He received the Nelson’s Prize for Humanity and Science from U.C. Davis (U.S., 2008). He was honored as Doctoris Honoris Causa by Debrecen University (Hungary, 2009). He has awarded a Life Contribution Prize in Internal Medicine (Israel, 2012), as well as the ACR Master Award (U.S., 2013). He is an honorary member of the Hungarian Association of Rheumatology, Slovenian National Academy of Sciences and the Royal College of Physicians (UK).

== Controversy ==
Two of Shoenfeld's scientific articles have been retracted. A 2016 paper asserting a link between HPV vaccine and behavioral problems in mice, was retracted due to concerns about its methodology and data.

In 2015 an article was published refuting the relationship between adjuvants and autoimmune conditions.

He served on the scientific advisory board of the anti-vaccine group Children's Medical Safety Research Institute, has spoken at a number of anti-vaccination conferences, and has regularly appeared as an expert witness for people attempting to prove injury from vaccines in court.
