= Autoimmunity Reviews =

- Discipline: Immunology
- Language: English
- Edited by: Yehuda Shoenfeld, M. Eric Gershwin

Publication details
- History: 2002–present
- Publisher: Elsevier
- Frequency: Bimonthly
- Impact factor: 8.3 (2024)

Standard abbreviations
- ISO 4: Autoimmun. Rev.

Indexing
- ISSN: 1568-9972 (print); 1873-0183 (web)
- LCCN: 2002243286
- OCLC no.: 936513729

Links
- Journal homepage; Online archive

Autoimmunity Reviews is a bimonthly peer-reviewed medical journal publishing review articles pertaining to autoimmunity. It was established in 2002 and is published by Elsevier. The editors-in-chief are Yehuda Shoenfeld (Tel Aviv University) and M. Eric Gershwin (UC Davis Medical Center). According to the Journal Citation Reports, the journal has a 2016 impact factor of 8.961.
