= Valero =

Valero may refer to:

== People ==
- Valero (name)

== Other ==
- Valero, a prefix referring to derivatives of valeric acid
- Valero Energy, an American Fortune 500 company operating a variety of energy production and fuel retail operations, based in San Antonio, Texas
- Valero, Salamanca, a municipality in the province of Salamanca, Spain
- Misión San Antonio de Valero, original name of The Alamo
- Valero Texas Open, professional golf tournament on the PGA Tour
- Estadio Manuel Martínez Valero, football stadium located in Elche, Spain
