= Vaccines and autism =

False claims about correlation of vaccines and autism

Extensive investigation into vaccines and vaccine ingredients have shown that they do not cause autism spectrum disorder. Some evidence even points to certain vaccines being preventative in some cases.

Major health authorities, including the World Health Organization, the National Health Service, the Centers for Disease Control and Prevention (Note: In November 2025, under the leadership of Robert F. Kennedy Jr. as the United States Secretary of Health and Human Services, the CDC's website was updated to claim that "The claim 'vaccines do not cause autism' is not an evidence-based claim because studies have not ruled out the possibility that infant vaccines cause autism." See Centers for Disease Control and Prevention § CDC revises stance on autism and vaccines and the § Political support in the US section below.) and the United States Food and Drug Administration, along with large-scale epidemiological research, reinforce the scientific consensus that vaccines are safe, that multiple concurrent vaccinations do not overwhelm the immune system, and that autism cannot be attributed to vaccination.

Scientist Peter Hotez researched the growth of the false claim and concluded that its spread originated with Andrew Wakefield's fraudulent 1998 paper, and that no prior paper supports a link. Despite the scientific consensus for the absence of a relationship, and the Wakefield paper's retraction, the anti-vaccination movement at large continues to promote theories linking the two.

Celebrity endorsements, social media campaigns and selective reporting have fuelled the anti-vaccination movement and public misunderstanding of vaccines. Fringe political actions continue to promote debunked claims. A developing tactic appears to be citing irrelevant or dubious studies to support a questionable claim.

== Claimed mechanisms ==
The claimed mechanisms have changed over time, in response to evidence refuting each in turn. Anti-vaccine groups claim that specific vaccine ingredients can cause autism. Some of the most frequently mentioned ones are thiomersal, aluminium adjuvants and formaldehyde.

=== MMR vaccine ===
The idea of a link between the MMR vaccine and autism came to prominence after the publication of a paper by Andrew Wakefield and others in The Lancet in 1998. This paper, which was retracted in 2010 and whose publication led to Wakefield being struck off the British medical register, has been described as "the most damaging medical hoax of the last 100 years".

Wakefield's primary claim was that he had isolated evidence of vaccine-strain measles virus RNA in the intestines of autistic children, leading to a condition he termed autistic enterocolitis (a condition never recognised or adopted by the scientific community). This finding was later shown to be due to errors made by the laboratory where the polymerase chain reaction (PCR) tests were performed.

In 2009 The Sunday Times reported that Wakefield had manipulated patient data and misreported results in his 1998 paper, thus falsifying a link with autism. A 2011 article in the British Medical Journal describes the way in which Wakefield manipulated the data in his study in order to arrive at his predetermined conclusion. An accompanying editorial in the same journal described Wakefield's work as an "elaborate fraud" which led to lower vaccination rates, putting hundreds of thousands of children at risk and diverting funding and other resources from research into the true cause of autism.

On 12 February 2009 a special court convened in the United States to review claims under its National Vaccine Injury Compensation Program ruled that parents of autistic children are not entitled to compensation in their contention that certain vaccines caused their children to develop autism.

The Centers for Disease Control and Prevention (CDC), the IOM of the United States National Academy of Sciences, and the National Health Service have all concluded that there is no link between the MMR vaccine and autism. A systematic review by the Cochrane Library concluded that there is no credible link between the MMR vaccine and autism, that the MMR vaccine has prevented diseases that still carry a heavy burden of death and complications, that the lack of confidence in the MMR vaccine has damaged public health, and that the design and reporting of safety outcomes in MMR vaccine studies are largely inadequate. Further, an epidemiology study concluded that even children labelled high risk for autism, due to an older autistic sibling, that received the MMR vaccine resulted in no causal connection between the vaccine and autism or the increased risk of being diagnosed with autism. The assumption that MMR vaccines cause autism is not isolated to the United States. A seven-year study was done in Denmark from 1991 to 1998 following children who received the MMR vaccine. The results of the study found that when comparing the vaccinated children to the unvaccinated children, the risk of autism in the vaccinated group was 0.92. Also, the risk of another autism disorder was 0.83. The study concluded there was no association between the MMR vaccine and autism. The result held even when exploring the age of the child when the vaccine was given, the vaccination date, or the amount of time after the vaccine.

=== Thiomersal ===
Thiomersal is an antifungal preservative used in small amounts in some multi-dose vaccines (where the same vial is opened and used for multiple patients) to prevent contamination of the vaccine. Thiomersal contains ethylmercury, a mercury compound which is related to, but significantly less toxic than, the neurotoxic pollutant methylmercury. Despite decades of safe use, public campaigns prompted the CDC and the American Academy of Pediatrics (AAP) to request vaccine makers to remove thiomersal from vaccines as quickly as possible on the precautionary principle. Thiomersal is now absent from all common United States and European Union vaccines, except for some preparations of influenza vaccine. Trace amounts remain in some vaccines due to production processes, at an approximate maximum of 1 microgramme, around 15% of the average daily mercury intake in the US for adults and 2.5% of the daily level considered tolerable by the World Health Organization (WHO). The action engendered concern thiomersal could have been responsible for autism.

The idea that thiomersal was a cause or trigger for autism is now considered disproven, as incidence rates for autism increased steadily even after thiomersal was removed from childhood vaccines. The cause of autism and mercury poisoning being associated is improbable because the symptoms of mercury poisoning are not present and are inherently inconsistent with the behaviours or symptoms of autism. There is no accepted scientific evidence that exposure to thiomersal is a factor in causing autism. A study by the CDC exploring mercury poisoning in vaccines concluded no signs of poisoning were present.

Under the US Food and Drug Administration Modernization Act (FDAMA) of 1997, the FDA conducted a comprehensive review of the use of thiomersal in childhood vaccines. Conducted in 1999, this review found no evidence of harm from the use of thiomersal as a vaccine preservative, other than local hypersensitivity reactions. Despite this, starting in 2000, parents in the United States pursued legal compensation from a federal fund arguing that thiomersal caused autism in their children. A 2004 Institute of Medicine (IOM) committee favored rejecting any causal relationship between autism and vaccines containing thiomersal and rulings from the vaccine court in three test claims in 2010 established the precedent that thiomersal is not considered a cause of autism.

=== Aluminium adjuvants ===
As mercury compounds in vaccines have been definitively ruled out as a cause of autism, some anti-vaccine activists propose aluminium adjuvants as the cause of autism. Aluminium adjuvants simulate immune receptors and cause a strengthened response to the antigen in a way that is natural to the body. Aluminium adjuvants can be used in the form of soluble salts, alumina, and hydroxide. There is no substantial scientific evidence that aluminium adjuvants are linked to autism. When confirming that aluminium adjuvants are not dangerous in vaccines, it was concluded that there was no traces of aluminium in the children's hair or blood over the minimum level of risks according to the United States Agency for Toxic Substances and Disease Registry.

Anti-vaccination activists commonly cite a number of papers which claim that there is in fact a link. These are mainly published in predatory open access journals, where peer-review is virtually non-existent. Work conducted by Christopher Shaw, Christopher Exley and Lucija Tomljenovic has been funded by the anti-vaccination Dwoskin Family Foundation. The work published by Shaw et al. has been discredited by the World Health Organization.

A review study published in the open-access journal Toxics suggests a link between early aluminium adjuvant exposure and autism; and concludes that there is a lack of fundamental scientific data demonstrating that aluminium adjuvants are safe.

=== Formaldehyde ===
Formaldehyde is another assumed link between vaccines and autism. Even though the assumption still circles around, formaldehyde has been used safely in the diphtheria vaccines to detoxify the bacteria used to make the vaccine. Another way it can be used is to inactivate the disease to be used in the vaccine. Formaldehyde can be found naturally in the body and environment. The human body uses formaldehyde to build amino acids and to generate the energy it needs. Formaldehyde is present in many ordinary things; it can be found in preservatives, materials used to build, and many products in homes. There is no safety concern for formaldehyde in vaccines. The most concerning repercussion is cancer after exposure to high levels of formaldehyde in the air. The amount of formaldehyde in some vaccines is less than what the body naturally produces.

=== Vaccine overload ===
Following the belief that individual vaccines caused autism was the idea of vaccine overload, which claims that too many vaccines at once may overwhelm or weaken a child's immune system and lead to adverse effects. The Children's Hospital of Philadelphia Vaccine Education Center compiled a list of vaccines recommended to children throughout history. They found that from 1985-1994 the recommended number of vaccines was eight. The schedule for 2011 to 2020 revealed the recommended number of vaccines was fourteen. Vaccine overload became popular after the National Vaccine Injury Compensation Program in the United States accepted the case of nine-year-old Hannah Poling. After showing signs of developmental delay as a toddler, Poling was diagnosed with encephalopathy caused by a mitochondrial enzyme deficit, which her family argued was triggered by multiple vaccines she received at nineteen months old. There have been multiple cases reported similar to this one, which led to the belief that vaccine overload caused autism. However, scientific studies show that vaccines do not overwhelm the immune system. In fact, conservative estimates predict that the immune system can respond to thousands of viruses simultaneously. It is known that vaccines constitute only a tiny fraction of the pathogens already naturally encountered by a child in a typical year. Common fevers and middle ear infections pose a much greater challenge to the immune system than vaccines do. Other scientific findings support the idea that vaccinations, and even multiple concurrent vaccinations, do not weaken the immune system or compromise overall immunity and evidence that autism has any immune-mediated pathophysiology has still not been found.

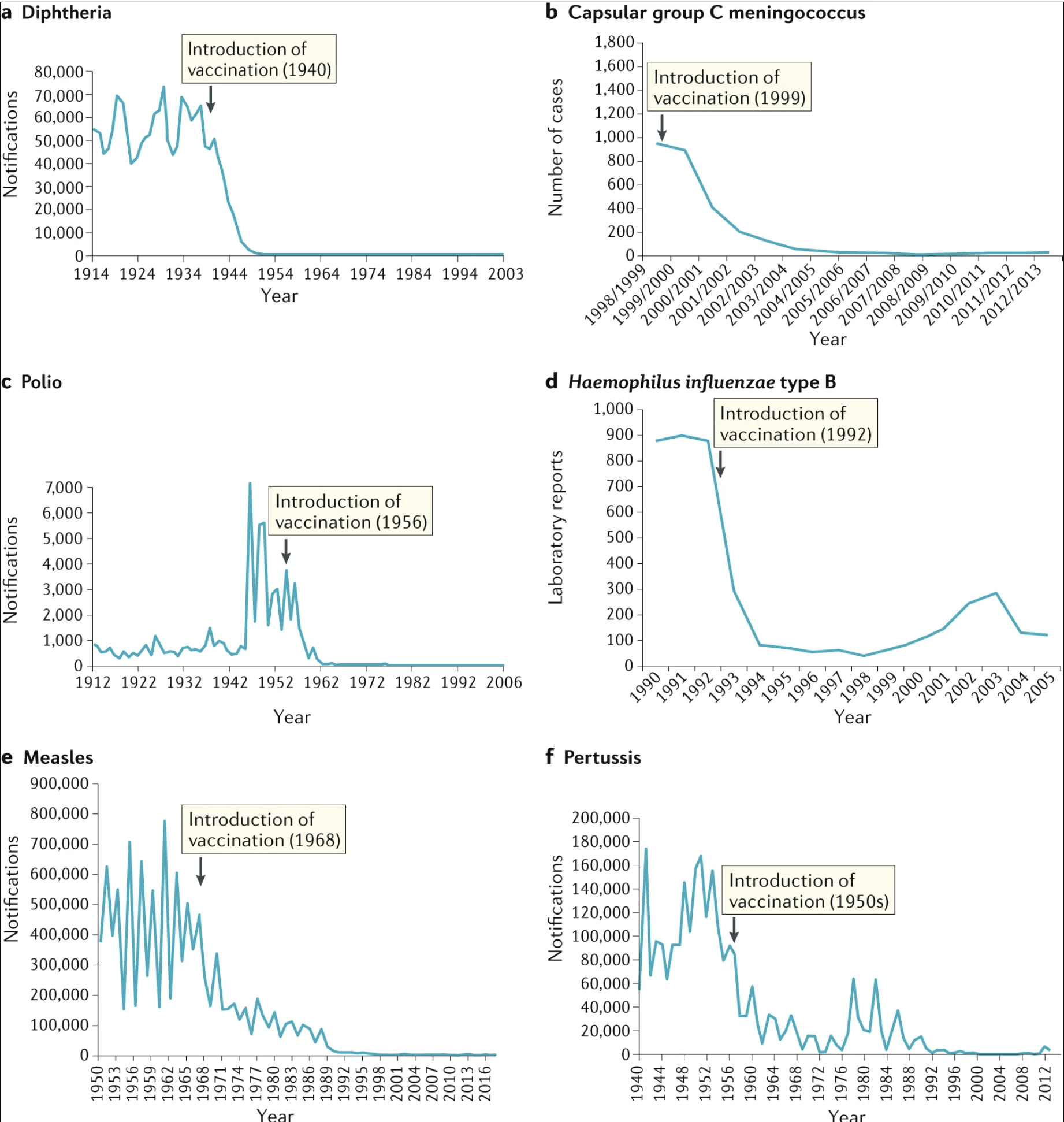
Impact of vaccines on diphtheria, meningococcal, polio, haemophilus influenzae type B, measles, and pertussis

Vaccines recommended from 1985-1994:

- Diphtheria
- Tetanus
- Pertussis
- Measles
- Mumps
- Rubella
- Polio
- Hib
- Hepatitis B (1991)

Vaccines recommended from 2011-2020:

- Diphtheria
- Tetanus
- Pertussis
- Measles
- Mumps
- Rubella
- Polio
- Hib
- Hepatitis B
- Varicella
- Hepatitis A
- Pneumococcal
- Influenza
- Rotavirus

Measles, mumps, and rubella vaccines were given together as MMR. Diphtheria, tetanus, and pertussis vaccines were given together as the DTaP. Regarding the latter, Sanofi Pasteur’s Tripedia DTaP vaccine automatically included autism on a long list of “adverse events” in 2005 due to unverified reports from consumers, although such reports did not "establish a causal relationship" to the vaccine at any point.

=== COVID-19 ===
A study, initially published in 2024, claimed that the COVID-19 vaccine could generate autism traits in male offsprings of rats. The study was criticised early on by scientists for its dubious methodology, and has been, in the summer of 2025, retracted on the grounds of methodological concerns.

== Celebrity involvement and social media ==
Some celebrities have spoken out on their views that autism is related to vaccination, including: Jenny McCarthy, Kristin Cavallari, Robert De Niro, Jim Carrey, Bill Maher and Pete Evans.

McCarthy, one of the most outspoken celebrities on the topic, has said her son Evan's autism diagnosis was a result of the MMR vaccine. She authored Louder than Words: A Mother's Journey in Healing Autism and co-authored Healing and Preventing Autism. She was also president of Generation Rescue, a non-profit organisation that claimed vaccines made children autistic and promoted various unproven treatments. Generation Rescue ceased operations in December 2019.

In September 2015 in the United States, Donald Trump, in a debate for the Republican Party's nomination for the 2016 US presidential election (which he won), stated he knew of a 2-year-old child who had recently received a combined vaccine, developed a fever, and subsequently autism.

Robert F. Kennedy Jr is one of the most notable proponents of the anti-vaccine movement. Kennedy published the book Thimerosal: Let the Science Speak: The Evidence Supporting the Immediate Removal of Mercury--A Known Neurotoxin--From Vaccines. He is also the former chairman of the board of Children's Health Defense, a group and website widely known for its anti-vaccination stance.

A study conducted through Facebook explored the results of anti-vaccine ads and pro-vaccine ads. The study found that even with a similar number of anti-vaccine ads and pro-vaccine ads, the middle point in the data set of ads per buyer was higher in anti-vaccine ads. Another difference the study revealed was that the anti-vaccine ads were primarily targeted toward women and young adults who possibly had children. The pro-vaccination ads were presented evenly to different ages.

== Public opinion ==
In December 2020 a poll of 1,115 adults in the United States found 12% of respondents believed there is evidence vaccinations cause autism; 51% believed there is no evidence; and 37% did not know.

An updated survey, conducted in March 2023, concluded that adults think the MMR health benefits are high/very high, at 72%, and the risk of side effects is low/very low, at 64%. There has also been a drop from 2019 in US adults who believe students in schools should be fully vaccinated. The 2023 survey showed that a decrease to 70% of US adults agree that children should be vaccinated for school but an increase to 28% believe that it is the parent's right to choose if the child is vaccinated for school.

== Political support in the US ==
In March 2025 the United States Department of Health and Human Services, overseen by Robert F. Kennedy Jr., hired the vaccine critic David Geier to conduct a study on the long-debunked link. Geier holds no medical credentials, and according to the BBC the idea of "[blaming] rising rates of autism on vaccines ... has been categorically debunked by large scientific studies over many years".

Under the leadership of Kennedy, an anti-vaccine activist, the CDC website on "Autism and Vaccines" was changed from its earlier September 2025 version to a new version on 19 November 2025. The revised webpage makes several false statements, contradicting long-standing scientific evidence that supports the absence of a causal link between childhood vaccines and autism. According to CDC staff, required scientific vetting for all public-facing agency webpages was entirely bypassed in this instance. As the Wall Street Journal points out, "… no association has been proven between vaccines and autism". Also, numerous medical associations and professionals immediately issued statements protesting against the changes, including experts from: the Center for Infectious Disease Research and Policy (CIDRAP); Children's Hospital of Philadelphia; Stanford University School of Medicine; the Texas Children's Hospital Center for Vaccine Development; the American Academy of Pediatrics (AAP); Harvard T.H. Chan School of Public Health; and the Autism Science Foundation.

== See also ==
- Discrimination against autistic people
