= Journal of Autoimmunity =

- Discipline: Immunology
- Language: English
- Edited by: M. Eric Gershwin, Yehuda Shoenfeld

Publication details
- History: 1988-present
- Publisher: Elsevier
- Frequency: 8/year
- Impact factor: 14.551 (2021)

Standard abbreviations
- ISO 4: J. Autoimmun.

Indexing
- CODEN: JOAUEP
- ISSN: 0896-8411
- LCCN: 88659269
- OCLC no.: 36982992

Links
- Journal homepage; Online access

The Journal of Autoimmunity is a peer-reviewed medical journal covering research on all aspects of autoimmunity. It was established in 1988 and is published 8 times per year by Elsevier. The editors-in-chief are Yehuda Shoenfeld (Sheba Medical Center) and M. Eric Gershwin (University of California, Davis). According to the Journal Citation Reports, the journal has a 2021 impact factor of 14.551.
