= Christopher Exley =

English chemist

- Education: University of Stirling
- Known for: Research on health effects of aluminium
- Awards: Royal Society University Research Fellowship (1994)
- Scientific career
- Fields: Inorganic chemistry
- Institutions: Keele University
- Thesis: Amelioration of aluminium toxicity in Atlantic salmon, Salmo salar L., with particular reference to aluminium/silicon interactions (1989)
- Doctoral advisor: J. D. Birchall

Christopher Exley is an English chemist known for his research on the health effects of aluminium exposure. He was Professor of Bioinorganic Chemistry and group leader of the Bioinorganic Chemistry Laboratory at Keele University.

He published the research finding that Carole Cross, a woman who died from aluminium poisoning as a result of the 1988 Camelford water pollution incident, had brain levels of aluminium over twenty times higher than normal. In 2012, he testified in an inquest into Cross's death in Taunton, England. He asserted that if victims of the poisoning consumed mineral water that contains high levels of silicic acid, even if they did so twenty-four years after the initial poisoning, it could help to remove the aluminium from their brains. He also criticized the government for advising residents of Cornwall to boil their water shortly after the incident, referring to this advice he told the inquest: "The advice given at the time was the worst possible advice to give. Boiling the water would have tripled the concentration of aluminium. It was absolutely terrible advice. I don't think anyone was given any good advice, it is utterly beyond belief and it cannot be acceptable." While some were affected, possibly fatally in one case, and advice at the time was agreed to have been incorrect, it is unlikely that there was any long-term effect from the Camelford incident. In September 2013 the government admitted that there had been a "manifest failure to give prompt appropriate advice and information to affected consumers" and offered an unreserved apology.

More recently he has become known for research claiming to link aluminium adjuvants in vaccines with autism. This work, some of which was paid for by unacknowledged donations from anti-vaccine group Children's Medical Safety Research Institute and some of which has subsequently been retracted, has led to him losing research funding. However, in February 2021, The Guardian reported that during the COVID-19 pandemic Exley had received over £150,000 to support his research through Keele University's donations portal. There is no evidence of any link, causal or otherwise, between vaccines and autism.
