= Israel Medical Association Journal =

- Discipline: Medicine
- Language: English
- Edited by: Yehuda Shoenfeld

Publication details
- History: 1999
- Publisher: Israel Medical Association (Israel)
- Frequency: Monthly
- Impact factor: 0.978 (2012)

Standard abbreviations
- ISO 4: Isr. Med. Assoc. J.

Indexing
- ISSN: 1565-1088
- LCCN: 00-243088
- OCLC no.: 43614582

Links
- Journal homepage

The Israel Medical Association Journal is a monthly peer-reviewed medical journal published by the Israel Medical Association. It was established in 1999, replacing the Israel Journal of Medical Sciences. The editor-in-chief is Yehuda Shoenfeld.

== See also ==
- Health care in Israel
