= Jacob Valero =

Jacob Valero (1813–1874) was the founder of the first private bank in Palestine, Jacob Valero & Company.

In 1839, Jacob (Ya'akov) Valero appeared in Jewish communal records as a ritual slaughterer of the Sephardi community in Jerusalem. In 1849, he was described as a "talmid hakham" (scholar). In 1835, his profession was listed as "moneychanger." He opened his bank in 1848 in the Old City of Jerusalem and managed it until his death. The Valero Bank financed the building of a railway from Jaffa to Jerusalem.

The Bank financed the building of the Prince Sergei Hostel in the Russian Compound and handled the money for Kaiser Wilhelm's grand entrance into Jerusalem in 1898.

Valero was an Ottoman subject until 1860, and then became a subject of the Austro-Hungarian Empire. The bank closed in 1915.

== See also ==
- Chaim Aharon Valero, son of Jacob Valero.
- Aaron Valero, great-grandson of Jacob Valero. Israeli physician and educator.

== Bibliography ==
- "Guide to Palestine and Egypt" by Macmillan & Co, (Page 15) Published 1901.
- Simon Sebag Montefiore Jerusalem The Biography (2011) Page 344,360. W&N (Orion) London. ISBN 0-297-85265-5
