= Harefuah =

- Discipline: Medicine
- Language: Hebrew, English

Publication details
- History: 1920–present

Standard abbreviations
- ISO 4: Harefuah

Indexing
- ISSN: 0017-7768

Harefuah (Hebrew: הרפואה) is a medical journal published by the Israel Medical Association. Articles are in Hebrew with abstracts in English. It has been published monthly since 1920. Its editor is Yehuda Shoenfeld.
