= Israel Medical Association =

National medical association of Israel

- ההסתדרות הרפואית בישראל
- Founded: 1912
- Location: Israel
- Website: www.ima.org.il

Israel Medical Association (IMA), is a professional association of physicians in Israel.

== History ==
The association traces its origins to the Hebrew Medicinal Society for Jaffa and the Jaffa District, founded in 1912, which later became the Hebrew Medical Association in the Land of Israel (HMA). Dr. Moshe Sherman, the country's first otolaryngologist, founded the association together with five other physicians. In 1935, he was elected chairman of the Israel Medical Association and later served as its honorary president.

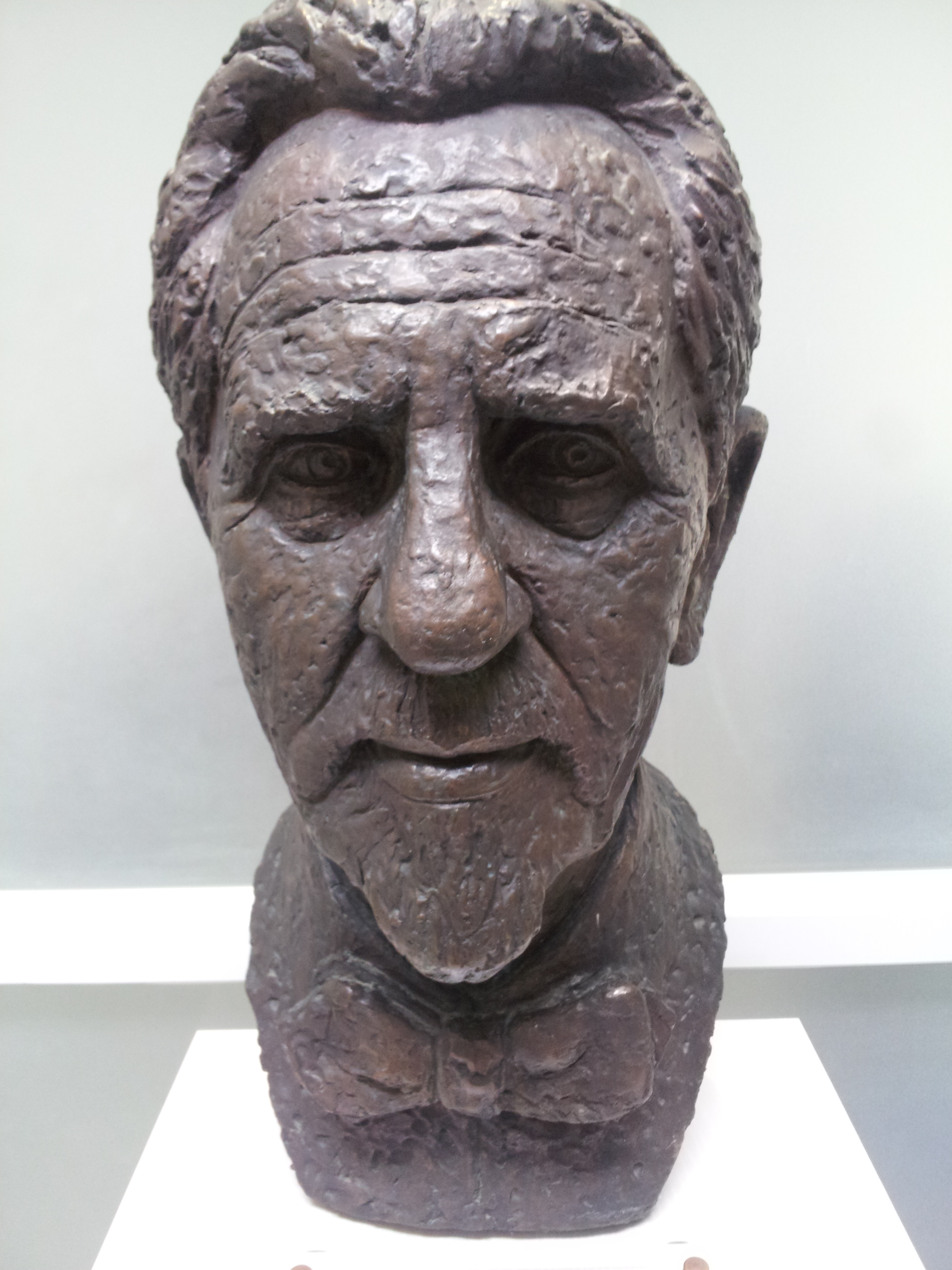
Bust of Dr. Moshe Sherman, Rambam Medical Center

The IMA has a world fellowship program open to physicians around the world. The current head of the Medical Association Chairman is Dr. Leonid Eidelman.

In 2007, Dr. Yoram Blacher, chairman of the IMA since 1995, was named president of the World Medical Association.

The association marked its centennial year in November 2011 with a symposium and exhibition at the European Union headquarters in Brussels. The events were organized by the Belgian Jewish Doctors’ Group, Bnai Brit International and the Board of Deputies of British Jews.

In January 2019, the Israel Medical Association banned members from performing conversion therapy on patients.

== International boycott campaigns ==
Following the outbreak of the Gaza war in October 2023, the IMA faced intensifying international pressure and campaigns for its suspension from global medical organizations. In 2025, both the British Medical Association and the South African Medical Association suspended institutional ties with the IMA over its stance on the conflict. In June 2026, a petition organized by the People's Health Movement, Artsen voor Gaza (Doctors for Gaza), and the health wing of Jewish Voice for Peace gained widespread attention after it was reported on by the British medical journal The Lancet. The petition, which gathered over 1,150 signatures from healthcare professionals, called for the IMA to be suspended from the World Medical Association (WMA) ahead of its October General Assembly in Rotterdam. Critics accused the IMA of violating medical ethics and international humanitarian law, alleging complicity in the mistreatment of Palestinian detainees over three decades, and criticizing its failure to publicly condemn the destruction of healthcare infrastructure in Gaza.

The IMA argued that the campaign dangerously conflated an independent medical association with a country's government, asserted that Hamas utilized a deliberate strategy of hiding beneath and within hospitals for military operations, and stated that its members consistently uphold universal medical ethics. It also highlighted its public statements supporting medical neutrality, humanitarian aid delivery, and internal lobbying efforts, such as an open letter from IMA chair Zion Hagay to the Israeli Prime Minister warning against the health risks of withholding tax funds from the Palestinian Authority. The Lancet noted that it had not identified any public statements by the IMA condemning Israeli attacks on Gaza's healthcare system, criticizing Israeli military conduct, calling for a ceasefire, or responding to United Nations reports regarding a genocide against Palestinians. The WMA defended the IMA's inclusion, stating it opposed excluding member associations based on the actions of their governments, and argued that a suspension would damage international medical dialogue and scientific collaboration rather than promote human rights.

== Publications ==
The association publishes two journals: Harefuah (Medicine) in Hebrew with English abstracts and Israel Medical Association Journal (IMAJ).

== See also ==
- Aron Brand
