= Macrophagic myofasciitis =

Pseudomedical diagnosis

- Other names: MMF
- Specialty: Histopathology

A macrophagic myofasciitis (MMF) lesion a histopathological finding involving inflammatory microphage formations with aluminium-containing crystal inclusions and associated microscopic muscle necrosis in biopsy samples of the injection site. A MMF "syndrome" refers to a muscle pain or weakness that, when biopsied, often results in the observation of a MMF lesion.

It is dubious whether the systemic "syndrome" represents a biological process connected to the local lesion, or even whether it is a specific condition. Most cases are reported in France, where there are more than 600 diagnoses among an immunized population of more than 64 million. The World Health Organization has concluded that

There is no evidence to suggest that MMF is a specific illness. MMF is a lesion containing aluminium salts, identified by histopathological examination, found at the site of previous vaccination with an aluminium-containing vaccine.

== The syndrome ==
MMF was originally described as a syndrome, with myalgia, arthralgia, marked asthenia, muscle weakness and fever as symptoms. Patients tend to have elevated creatine kinase, erythrocyte sedimentation rate, and a myopathic electromyograph.

== The lesion ==
People with MMF-the-syndrome generally have a muscle biopsy consistent with MMF-the-lesion. Seen within the muscle are sheets of macrophage infiltration that stain positive with periodic acid–Schiff stain. Aluminum has been detected in these samples by energy-dispersive X-ray spectroscopy. The individuals had a history of receiving aluminium-containing vaccines, administered months to several years prior to observation of MMF lesion.

A hypothetical interpretation of the biopsy finding is that the macrophages are stuck in a "death loop": MP ingests the aluminum, the aluminum causes lysosome rupture, the MP dies, and a newly arrived MP ingests the dead MP (along with the aluminum within) to repeat the loop.
