= Haim Aharon Valero =

Palestinian Jewish banker (1846–1923)

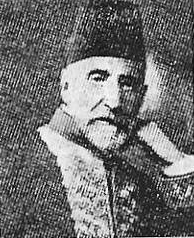
- Born: 1845; Jerusalem, Ottoman Empire
- Died: 1923 (aged 77–78)

Haim Aharon Valero (1845–1923) was a banker, entrepreneur and a prominent figure in the Jewish community of 19th century Jerusalem. Under his direction, the Valero Bank, founded in 1848 by his father Jacob Valero, acted as catalyst in the development of the Jewish community under Ottoman rule. The bank's capital and financial services were employed in the acquisition of land and building, helping transform Jerusalem and nearby townships from stagnation and poverty towards the modernization of the 20th century.

== Biography ==
Haim Aharon Valero was born in Jerusalem in 1845. He benefitted from a broader education, including five languages: French, Turkish, Arabic, Hebrew and Ladino (the language spoken by the Jews of Spain). At the age of fifteen he started working as clerk in the bank run by his father and by 1875 became the manager of the Jerusalem branch. By this time the bank had no other partners. In 1880, after the death of his older brother Joseph, he became director of the bank.

Haim Aharon's father, Jacob Valero (1813–1874), was of Spanish-Jewish origins (Sephardic), whose ancestors were forced out of Spain by the Spanish Inquisition in the late 15th century. His family migrated to the Ottoman Empire and Jacob was born in Istanbul. He received a traditional Jewish education and as a young man (in the early 1830s) migrated to Ottoman Syria and settled in Jerusalem.

Jacob Valero married Esther Aziza Levi and had three children. Initially he worked as a butcher, but after a while switched to money changing, which went from strength to strength. In collaboration with Haim Amzalak (another Sephardic Jew), Gavriel (some say Yehuda) Papu and Jacob (Giacomo) Pascal (an Armenian in the employ of the Austrian consulate - a ‘silent’ partner), he founded in 1848 the first bank in Palestine, named Jacob Valero & Co. The main branch was located in the Old City close to the Jaffa Gate, in a small two room flat. With the expansion of its operations, a branch was opened in the port of Jaffa, directed by his eldest son Joseph (1837–1879) and the bank also had representation (possibly another branch) in Damascus.

In around 1880, Valero bought a 10-year old Ethiopian slave called Sarah La Preta, when the central government enforced the emancipation of slaves, she chose to stay with the Valero family and converted to Judaism.

Valero married Simha Papu and had seven children with her. After she died at the age of 38, he married his niece, Miriam Valero, and had two more children. He died in 1923 and was buried at the Mount of Olives cemetery.

== Valero Bank ==
The early operations of the bank consisted of financial services for the local community: deposits, loans, transfers. The bank was the main conduit for the transactions of the Pekidim and Amarkalim of the Holy Land organisation (literally: "clerks and agents" in Hebrew), a Dutch-Jewish society based in Amsterdam and dedicated to the distribution of charity funds collected in Europe for the Old Yishuv (Halukkah). The bank's clientele expanded along with its services, to include consulates, churches, other religious institutions and charities. It acted as agent for the Ottoman administration as well as Austrian, German and Russian governments. It also had the status of correspondent with the Rothschilds of Paris, London and Vienna (the Österreichische Credit-Anstalt), the Samuel Montagu & Co. bankers of London and Banque Russe pour le Commerce Étranger in Paris. When Emperor Franz Joseph I of Austria-Hungary visited Jerusalem in November 1869 (en route to the opening of the Suez Canal), the bank handled the transfer of funds required to cover the costs of the trip. Jacob Valero was subsequently awarded the Order of the Iron Crown. In his ‘Jerusalem Memory Book’ (1913), Nahum Dov Freiman assessed the resources of the Valero Bank at 3,000,000 francs (£120,000). The bank made a significant contribution to the economic development of the city and played a significant wider role in the transfer of funds from Europe to a wide range of Jewish organizations.

The strategy of the Czar of Russia to expand the influence of the Russian Empire led to a steady increase in the number of Russian pilgrims to Jerusalem in the second half of the 19th century. The Czar, who saw himself as defender of Eastern Orthodox Christianity, sought a foothold in the city. In October 1860, the Russian government acquired a large plot and work started on what was then the largest construction project in Jerusalem. The walled Russian Compound, as it is known until this day, comprised a church, hospital, the residence of the Russian consul and hostels for pilgrims. The bank helped realize the project through the transfer of funds and other banking services and in recognition of this, in 1888 the Czar honoured Haim Aharon Valero with the Order of St. Anna.

== Affiliation with the Rothschild family ==
The Valero bank provided a range of services to the Rothschilds, a very prominent family of European bankers based in Vienna, Paris and London. Haim Aharon developed close business contacts with Baron Edmond James de Rothschild. When the baron, as patron of Jewish settlement activity, began substantial investment in Jewish community of Ottoman Syria in the 1880s, he was assisted by the bank through transfers and deposits. There was a strong social connection too – when visiting Europe, Haim Aharon and members of the family stayed as personal guests of the Rothschilds.

== Acquisition of land ==
Over the years of the bank's contacts within the spheres of finance and real estate, the bank gained titles of land, often through defaults on loans made for land purchases in various parts of the country. At the same time Haim Aharon also made his own land purchases in Jerusalem including many plots along Jaffa Street, at the Damascus Gate, in the suburbs that are today Katamon and Mekor Chaim, as well as in the towns of Hebron and Jaffa. Yeshayahu Press described Haim Aharon as ‘the Rothschild of Jerusalem’. A number of important buildings were erected on land acquired from the Valero family, including Bikur Cholim Hospital and the Mahane Yehuda market (which was originally named the Valero Market).

In the latter part of the 19th century the bank faced competition from European banks, which by then established a growing presence in Mutasarrifate of Jerusalem. The bank finally closed in 1915 with the onset of the First World War. Haim Aharon died eight years later.

== Communal activism ==
His activities and wealth soon earned Haim Aharon an important standing in the city, both in the Jewish and the wider community. His education and mastery of different languages were critical to Haim Aharon's ability to perform his various roles in the social, commercial and political spheres. He served as the representative of the Jewish community with the city authorities, under the tutelage of the Ottomans, but amongst his friends Haim Aharon counted many of the local Arab residents, including several of the leading Arab families. Between 1831 and 1841, after the conquest of Jerusalem by Egypt, he served as member of the district management committee. This enabled him to extend his business and social networks and in 1868 he was appointed as one of two Jewish representatives on the Jerusalem municipality.

In the mid 19th century the population of Jerusalem was 13,000, of whom 7,100 were Jews, mostly Sephardic and Oriental. By the 1880 the Jewish population trebled with the majority being Ashkenazi (of European descent). Rivalries characterized the different Jewish communities, who ran their own separate organizations. For many years the Jerusalem Sephardic community was led by the Sephardic Community Council, normally headed by senior rabbis who served as official representatives of the community with the Ottoman authorities. Jacob Valero was nominated to the Council in 1870, the first person not a rabbi to bear the title ‘President of the Kollel’. He handled the committee's financial affairs and came to be known as ‘trustee of the poor’. His eldest son continued this activity, to be followed in the 1880s by Haim Aharon.

Valero was one of the representatives of the Moses Montefiore Memorial Trust, founded in 1874 with the aim of housing Jerusalem Jews. The trust made loans for building in Mazkeret Moshe (1882), Ohel Moshe (1882), Yemin Moshe (1892), Zichron Moshe (1904) and Kiryat Moshe (1924). He supported a number of charitable causes, including the donation of land on Jaffa Street for the building of a Sephardic old people's home, opened in 1908.

== Commemoration ==
At a cost of over $2.-Million, the Valero compound – a chaotic parking lot that houses the city's annual Succot "lulav and etrog market" – is being redeveloped into an urban square. The project, designed by architects Rachel Weiner and Vered Singer, is being carried out by the Jerusalem municipality's Eden Company with funding from the municipality and the Transportation Ministry.

The new Valero Square, illuminated by decorative lighting and surfaced in granite and limestone, will provide both shade and sitting corners for Mahaneh Yehuda shoppers as well as serving as a venue for cultural events. The square preserves the memory of Jacob Valero (1813–1874), the founder of the first private bank in Mutasarrifate of Jerusalem, Jacob Valero & Company, and his son Haim Aharon Valero (1845–1923), who was also a banker and served as head of the city's Sephardi kollel. The alley bordering the new square on the north is named after Haim Valero.

== See also ==
Aaron Valero (1913–2000), grandson of Haim Aharon Valero, Israeli physician and educator.

== Bibliography ==
- Freiman, Nahum Dov (1913). Jerusalem Memory BookVol 1, Jerusalem; Ariel,1980 (Reprint of 1913 edition)(Hebrew).
- Kark, Ruth and Glass, Joseph (2007). Sephardi Entrepreneurs in Jerusalem: The Valero Family 1800-1948 (English Translation Edition). Gefen Publishing House. ISBN 978-965-229-396-1
- Kark, Ruth and Glass, Joseph (2005). The Valero Family: Seven Generations in Jerusalem, 1800-1948 (Original Hebrew Edition). Gefen Publishing House. ISBN 965-229-336-9
- Kark, Ruth; B. Glass, Joseph (2004). "The Valero Family: Sephardi-Arab Relations in Ottoman and Mandatory Jerusalem". Jerusalem Quarterly (21): 27. doi:10.70190/jq.I21.p27.
- "Guide to Palestine and Egypt", by Macmillen & Co, (Page 15), Published 1901.
- Montefiore Simon Sebag, (2011). Jerusalem The Biography(Page 344, 360).London. W&N (Orion) ISBN 0-297-85265-5
- Yehoshua Ben Arieh, Jerusalem in the 19th Century, II: emergence of the New City, Yad Ishak Ben Zvi and St Martin's Press (1986)
- Mordechai Eliav, Eretz Israel and its Yeshuv in the 19th Century 1777–1917, Jerusalem Keter (Hebrew 1978)
