= Neuromolecular Medicine =

NeuroMolecular Medicine
- Discipline: Neurology, molecular medicine
- Language: English
- Edited by: Eitan Okun and Raghu Vemuganti

Publication details
- History: 2002-present
- Publisher: Springer Science+Business Media
- Frequency: Quarterly

Standard abbreviations
- ISO 4: Neuromolecular Med.

Indexing
- CODEN: NMEEAN
- ISSN: 1535-1084 (print); 1559-1174 (web)
- LCCN: 2001213164
- OCLC no.: 605176440

Links
- Journal homepage; Online archive

NeuroMolecular Medicine is a quarterly peer-reviewed medical journal covering research on the molecular and biochemical basis of neurological disorders. It is published by Springer Science+Business Media and the editors-in-chief are Eitan Okun (Bar-Ilan University) and Raghu Vemuganti (University of Wisconsin).

== Abstracting and indexing ==
The journal is abstracted and indexed in:

- Science Citation Index Expanded
- PubMed/MEDLINE
- Scopus
- PsycINFO
- EMBASE
- Chemical Abstracts Service
- Academic OneFile
- Biological Abstracts
- BIOSIS Previews
- Elsevier Biobase
- EMBiology

According to the Journal Citation Reports, the journal has a 2020 impact factor of 3.8.
