= Letter board =

A letter board may refer to several devices.

- marquee, a customizable form of signage that employs individually movable letters of the alphabet.
- communication board, a device used to supplement verbal communication used by individuals with speech and language impairments or non-verbal communicators may use communication boards depending on their degree of gross motor skills.
