= LAMH =

LAMH may refer to:

- Holocaust Museum LA (formerly the Los Angeles Museum of the Holocaust)
- Lámh, a system of communication used in Ireland for the developmentally disabled
