= Tangible symbol systems =

Pictures or objects used as symbols

Tangible symbols are a type of augmentative and alternative communication (AAC) that uses objects or pictures that share a perceptual relationship with the items they represent as symbols. A tangible symbol's relation to the item it represents is perceptually obvious and concrete – the visual or tactile properties of the symbol resemble the intended item. Tangible Symbols can easily be manipulated and are most strongly associated with the sense of touch. These symbols can be used by individuals who are not able to communicate using speech or other abstract symbol systems, such as sign language. However, for those who have the ability to communicate using speech, learning to use tangible symbols does not hinder further developing acquisition of natural speech and/or language development, and may even facilitate it.

== Definition ==
The term tangible symbols was first developed by Charity Rowland and Philip Schweigert, and refers to two-dimensional pictures or three-dimensional objects used as symbols to convey meaning. The items are termed "tangible" because they are concrete items that can be manipulated by the user and communication partner. Symbols can be used individually or combined with other symbols in order to create new messages. Tangible symbols are used as a means of communication for individuals who are unable to understand or communicate using abstract systems, such as speech or sign language.

Properties of tangible symbols include permanency, capacity to be manipulated by both the user and the communication partner, and an obvious relationship between the symbol and the referent. They can represent items, people, activities and/or events, and look or feel similar to what they refer to. For example, a cup can be used as three-dimensional tangible symbol to represent the action: "drink". A photograph of a cup can be used as a two-dimensional tangible symbol to also represent the action: "drink". Two- and three-dimensional symbols are used to fit the cognitive and sensory abilities of the individual, as well as the individual's unique experiences.

Rowland and Schweigert use the term tangible symbols to refer to conceptually tangible items like two-dimensional pictures or three-dimensional objects. However, other authors, such as Beukelman and Mirenda, use the term to exclusively describe three-dimensional physical objects that display concrete properties such as shape or texture.

According to Rowland and Schweigert, "for some individuals, the use of tangible symbols may be used to bridge the gap between gestural communication and the use of formal language systems. For others, tangible symbols may represent an ultimate level of communicative competence."

Level of communication	Means of communication
Presymbolic	Body and limb movements, gestures, vocalizations
Concrete symbolic	Symbolic gestures and vocalizations, tangible symbols: objects (three-dimensional) and pictures (two-dimensional)
Abstract symbolic	Speech, sign language, printed language, Braille, abstract shapes, abstract graphics

== History ==
Historically, objects and pictures have frequently been used as communication devices. Many authors have also used picture symbols, such as line drawings and photographs to develop language in individuals with little or no speech and/or cognitive disabilities. Tangible symbols emerged from Van Dijk's work in the 1960s using objects as symbols to develop language in deaf-blind children. In turn, Van Dijk's work was based on the concept "symbol formation" developed by Werner and Kaplan (1963), who theorized that "symbol formation" referred to the process of developing language by creating symbols in our minds.

== Types of tangible symbols ==
Rowland and Schweigert propose that tangible symbols can be divided into hierarchical categories, ranging from most concrete to most abstract symbols:

- Identical objects are real items that are equal to their referent and are the most concrete type of tangible symbol. An example includes using a toothbrush to represent "brush your teeth". Beukelman and Mirenda includes in this category miniature objects: items that are smaller than what they symbolize, such as having a small toy toilet indicate "toilet".
- Partial/associated objects refers to a portion of the object they represent, and therefore are less concrete than identical objects. For example, a shoelace would symbolize "shoes".
- Symbols with one or two shared features have a resemblance to their referent, like using a mould of a loaf of bread for "bread". This category is sometimes included in the partial/associated objects category.
- Artificial symbols are abstract symbols that do not have a direct resemblance to their referent, such as having a 3D shape (i.e. an apple) that is attached to a cafe door be used as the symbol for "cafe". Beukelman and Mirenda include textured symbols in this category. An example of a textured symbol is using a piece of spandex material to denote "bathing suit".
- Three-dimensional symbols may be identical objects, parts of objects, or associated objects. A three-dimensional symbol will share similar features of the focused object, creating a meaningful symbol.
- Two-dimensional pictures, such as photographs and line drawings, are the most abstract type of tangible symbols. They are commonly used for both expressive and receptive communication, whereas the three-dimensional symbols are often used for receptive only communication (i.e. to cue the individual for upcoming events).

The type of tangible symbol used is chosen based on the cognitive and sensory abilities of the learner/user. The meaning behind each symbol is not universal, but by using a symbol the individual is familiar with, a meaningful symbol is created. Tangible symbols should be constructed by meaningful and motivating symbols that will provide the individual with the most opportunities to practice using the new system.

== Users of tangible symbols ==
Individuals who can benefit from using tangible symbols include those who may lack the skills to communicate using verbal speech or other various communication systems such as sign language. Users of tangible symbols may include individuals with cognitive disabilities (including developmental delay and intellectual disability), sensory and/or visual impairments (blindness and/or deafblindness), developmental disabilities (such as autism spectrum disorder), and orthopedic impairments. Rowland and Schweigert claim that tangible symbols do not require the use of high demands on the learner's cognitive abilities, memory, visual perception, and motor abilities because they are:

- Iconic and concrete: they have a clear connection what they refer to.
- Permanent: the user does not need to recall the object, but simply be able to recognize them.
- Manipulable: can be picked up and used by the learner and who s/he is communicating with.
- Tactually discriminable: can be identified by touch.
- May be indicated through a simple motor response: such as eye gazing, touching, or pointing.

Furthermore, simple behavioral responses can be used with tangible items. For example, learners that are unable to speak can simply point, touch, pick up, or look (in cases of severe motoric impairment) at the object to answer a question or make a request. Finally, three-dimensional objects can be distinguished from one another using touch, and therefore they are suitable for people with visual impairments or blindness. A study by Rowland and Schweigert found individuals who were already able to communicate using gestures or vocalizations more readily learned to use tangible symbols than those who did not have intentional pre-symbolic communication skills.

== Application of tangible symbols ==
Presentation format depends on the users visual scanning and motoric ability. The tangible symbols can placed in front of the user within reach, placed on a board for visual scanning, or placed in a book for access.

Typically, tangible symbols are custom made and tailored to the individual child. If pre-made sets are used, it is assumed that the symbols are familiar and motivating for the user. It is important to utilize frequently occurring and highly motivating symbols in order to optimize opportunities for use.

Tangible symbol system offers a manual and DVD as well as an online course. For more information on tangible symbol system instructional strategies, please reference: http://designtolearn.com/products/tangible_symbol_systems

== Universal tangible symbol system ==
In 2009, Ellen Trief, Susan M. Bruce, Paul W. Cascella, and Sarah Ivy created a Universal Tangible Symbol System. They began by developing a survey to determine which tangible symbols were already in use, new activities and concepts for which tangible systems are needed, and participant preferences for tangible symbols from a pilot study. Participants included teachers and speech–language pathologists from four New York City schools. Following the survey, an advisory board consisting of directors of the New York City schools, speech-language pathologists, the designer and manufacturer of the symbols, a representative from the Perkins School for the Blind, college professors, and a graduate research assistant reviewed and discussed the results. This resulted in the establishment of the 55 universal tangible symbols seen in the chart below. However, this universal tangible symbol system should not replace a system already established for an individual.

Activity	Chosen symbol
Dismissal	Strap with a buckle
Bathroom	White tile with a black edge
Gym	Tennis Ball
Speech	Mouth or lips
Classroom	Doorknob
Literacy	Small, thick book
Circle time	Wooden circle
Outside	Three stones
Music	Bells
Occupational therapy	Three beads
Physical therapy	Squishy ball
Snack	Small, empty snack bag
Cookie	Cookie
Computer	Floppy disc
Art	Paintbrush
Sensory	Small tube of lotion
Rest time	Small square of a blanket
Nurse's office	Large Band-Aid
Toothbrush	Toothbrush
Cooking	Measuring spoons
Orientation and mobility	Tip of a long cane
Arrival	Plastic hands
Math	Unifix cube
Science	Magnet
Vision	Small eyeglasses
Center time	Clothes pin
Drink	Cup
Lunchroom	Spoon
Break	Timer
No	Raised "X"
Community	Piece of a tactile map
Stander	Vinyl square
Orthodics	A half-cup measuring cup with a Velcro strip
Calendar	Piece of a calendar from American Printing House for the Blind
Walk	Shoe or sneaker
Light box	Plastic piece from a light-box kit
More	Piece of red velvet
Games	Spinner
Food	Small plate
Finished	Spool on a cord
Juice	Juice box
Bubbles	Bubble wand
Milk	Milk box
Yes	Raised "O"
"Itsy Bitsy Spider"	Plastic spider
"Twinkle, Twinkle"	Raised, shiny star
"Wheels on the Bus"	School bus
"Alphabet Song"	Raised letters "A", "B", and "C"
Bedtime	Piece of a comforter
Park	Metal chain
Church or temple	Smooth molding in the shape of a roof
Bath time	Small bar of soap
Set the table	Piece of a placemat
Do the dishes	Small dish
Car ride	Car keys or house keys
