= The Diving Bell and the Butterfly (film) =

2007 film by Julian Schnabel

- Theatrical release poster
- French: Le scaphandre et le papillon
- Directed by: Julian Schnabel
- Screenplay by: Ronald Harwood
- Based on: The Diving Bell and the Butterfly by Jean-Dominique Bauby
- Produced by: Kathleen Kennedy; Jon Kilik
- Starring: Mathieu Amalric; Emmanuelle Seigner; Marie-Josée Croze; Anne Consigny; Max von Sydow
- Cinematography: Janusz Kamiński
- Edited by: Juliette Welfling
- Music by: Paul Cantelon
- Production companies: Pathé Renn Production; Canal+ The Kennedy/Marshall Company; France 3 Cinéma
- Distributed by: Pathé Distribution (France/United Kingdom); Miramax Films (United States)
- Release dates: 22 May 2007 (Cannes Film Festival); 23 May 2007 (France); 30 November 2007 (United States)
- Running time: 112 minutes
- Countries: France; United States
- Language: French
- Budget: $12.8 million
- Box office: $19.8 million

The Diving Bell and the Butterfly (French: Le Scaphandre et le Papillon) is a 2007 biographical drama film directed by Julian Schnabel and written by Ronald Harwood. Based on Jean-Dominique Bauby's 1997 memoir, the film depicts Bauby's life after he suffered a massive stroke that left him with a condition known as locked-in syndrome. Bauby is played by Mathieu Amalric.

The Diving Bell and the Butterfly won awards at the Cannes Film Festival, the Golden Globes, the BAFTAs, and the César Awards, and received four Oscar nominations. Several critics later listed it as one of the best films of its decade. It ranks 77th in BBC's 100 Greatest Films of the 21st Century.

== Plot ==
The first third of the film is told from the main character's, Jean-Dominique Bauby, or Jean-Do as his friends call him, first person perspective. The film opens as Bauby wakes from his three-week coma in a hospital in Berck-sur-Mer, France. After an initial falsely positive description from one doctor, a neurologist explains that Bauby has locked-in syndrome, an extremely rare condition in which the patient is almost completely physically paralyzed, but remains mentally unchanged. At first, the viewer primarily hears Bauby's "thoughts" (he thinks that he is speaking but no one hears him), which are inaccessible to the other characters (who are seen through his one functioning eye).

A speech therapist and physical therapist try to help Bauby become as functional as possible. Bauby cannot speak, but he develops a system of communication involving blinking his left eye as his therapist reads a list of letters; with this process, Bauby spells out messages one letter at a time.

Gradually, the film's restricted point of view widens, and the viewer begins to see Bauby through scenes from his past as well as via the perspectives of those around him. The film shows a visit to Lourdes and conveys Bauby's fantasies about beaches, mountains, the Empress Eugénie and an erotic feast with one of his transcriptionists. We learn that Bauby had been editor of the popular French fashion magazine Elle, and that he had a deal to write a book reimagining The Count of Monte Cristo from a female perspective. He decides that he will still write a book, using his slow and exhausting communication technique. A woman from the publishing house with which Bauby had the original book contract takes dictation.

The new book describes his current life, trapped in his body, which he sees as being suspended in murky water within an old-fashioned deep-sea diving bell with brass helmet, which is called a scaphandre in French. But those around him describe his still-vibrant spirit as a butterfly.

The story of Bauby's writing is juxtaposed with his recollections and regrets prior to his stroke. We see his three children, their mother, his mistress, his friends, and his father. He encounters people from his past whose lives bear similarities to his own "entrapment": a friend who was kidnapped in Beirut and held in solitary confinement for four years, and his own 92-year-old father, who is confined to his own apartment, because he is too frail to descend four flights of stairs.

Bauby eventually completes his memoir and hears the critics' responses. He dies of pneumonia ten days after its publication. The closing credits are accentuated by reversed shootings of breaking glacier ice (the forward versions are used in the opening credits), accompanied by the Joe Strummer & the Mescaleros song "Ramshackle Day Parade".

== Cast ==
- Mathieu Amalric as Jean-Dominique Bauby
- Emmanuelle Seigner as Céline Desmoulins
- Anne Consigny as Claude Mendibil
- Marie-Josée Croze as Henriette Durand
- Olatz López Garmendia as Marie Lopez
- Patrick Chesnais as Dr. Lepage
- Max von Sydow as Mr. Bauby Sr.
- Isaach de Bankolé as Laurent
- Marina Hands as Joséphine
- Niels Arestrup as Pierre Roussin
- Anne Alvaro as Betty
- Zinedine Soualem as Joubert
- Emma de Caunes as Empress Eugénie
- Françoise Lebrun as Madame Bauby

== Production ==
The film was originally to be produced by American company Universal Studios and the screenplay was originally in English, with Johnny Depp slated to star as Bauby. According to the screenwriter, Ronald Harwood, the choice of Julian Schnabel as director was recommended by Depp. Universal subsequently withdrew, and Pathé took up the project two years later. Depp dropped the project due to scheduling conflicts with Pirates of the Caribbean: At World's End. Schnabel remained as director. The film was eventually produced by Pathé and France 3 Cinéma in association with Banque Populaire Images 7 and the American Kennedy/Marshall Company and in participation with StudioCanal and CinéCinéma.

According to the New York Sun, Schnabel insisted that the movie should be in French, resisting pressure by the production company to make it in English, believing that the rich language of the book would work better in the original French, and even went so far as to learn French to make the film. Harwood tells a slightly different story: Pathé wanted "to make the movie in both English and French, which is why bilingual actors were cast"; he continues that "Everyone secretly knew that two versions would be impossibly expensive", and that "Schnabel decided it should be made in French".

Schnabel said his influence for the film was drawn from personal experience:

My father got sick and he was dying. He was terrified of death and had never been sick in his life. So he was in this bed at my house, he was staying with me, and this script arrived for The Diving Bell and the Butterfly. As my father was dying, I read Ron Harwood's script. It gave me a bunch of parameters that would make a film have a totally different structure. As a painter, as someone who doesn't want to make a painting that looks like the last one I made, I thought it was a really good palette. So personally and artistically these things all came together.

Several key aspects of Bauby's personal life were fictionalized in the film, most notably his relationships with the mother of his children and his girlfriend. In reality, it was not Bauby's estranged girlfriend who stayed with him while he lay almost inanimate on a hospital bed, it was his girlfriend of several years.

== Reception ==
=== Critical response ===
The film received universal acclaim from critics. Review aggregation website Rotten Tomatoes gives the film a score of 94%, based on reviews from 176 critics, and an average rating of 8.30/10, with the general consensus stated as, "Breathtaking visuals and dynamic performances make The Diving Bell and the Butterfly a powerful biopic." Metacritic gave the film an average score of 92/100, based on 36 reviews, indicating "universal acclaim".

=== Top ten lists ===
The film appeared on many critics' top ten lists of the best films of 2007.

- 1st
  - Ann Hornaday, The Washington Post
  - Carina Chocano, Los Angeles Times (tied with The Savages)
  - David Edelstein, New York magazine
  - Frank Scheck, The Hollywood Reporter
  - Joe Morgenstern, The Wall Street Journal
  - Kevin Crust, Los Angeles Times
  - Kirk Honeycutt, The Hollywood Reporter
  - Lawrence Toppman, The Charlotte Observer
- 2nd
  - Kenneth Turan, Los Angeles Times
  - Michael Phillips, Chicago Tribune
  - Peter Rainer, The Christian Science Monitor
  - Fredrik Gunerius Fevang, The Fresh Films
- 3rd
  - Dana Stevens, Slate
  - Desson Thomson, The Washington Post
  - Liam Lacey and Rick Groen, The Globe and Mail
  - Stephanie Zacharek, Salon
  - Stephen Farber, The Hollywood Reporter
  - Stephen Holden, The New York Times
  - Steven Rea, The Philadelphia Inquirer
- 4th
  - Ray Bennett, The Hollywood Reporter
- 5th
  - Andrew O'Hehir, Salon
  - Ty Burr, The Boston Globe
- 6th
  - James Berardinelli, ReelViews
  - Glenn Kenny, Premiere
  - Peter Vonder Haar, Film Threat
- 7th
  - A. O. Scott, The New York Times (tied with Into the Wild)
  - David Ansen, Newsweek
  - Michael Rechtshaffen, The Hollywood Reporter
  - Rene Rodriguez, The Miami Herald
  - Sheri Linden, The Hollywood Reporter

=== Retrospective editions ===
In a 2016 poll by BBC, the film was listed as one of the top 100 films since 2000 (77th position).

In 2024, Looper ranked it number 13 on its list of the "50 Best PG-13 Movies of All Time," writing "The restrictive nature of [Jean-Dominique] Bauby's condition could have daunted other filmmakers, but director Julian Schnabel managed to figure out the tiniest ways to convey this man's interior world. Though Bauby may have thought his life was over once he was paralyzed, the critically-praised film of The Diving Bell and the Butterfly shows how truly alive this man's spirit was in the face of adversity."

=== Awards and nominations ===
It was nominated for four Academy Awards, but because the film was co-produced by an American company, it was ineligible for the Best International Feature Film category.

Award	Category	Recipient	Result
Academy Awards	Best Director	Julian Schnabel	Nominated
Academy Awards	Best Adapted Screenplay	Ronald Harwood	Nominated
Academy Awards	Best Cinematography	Janusz Kamiński	Nominated
Academy Awards	Best Film Editing	Juliette Welfling	Nominated
BAFTA Awards	Best Film Not in the English Language		Nominated
BAFTA Awards	Best Adapted Screenplay	Ronald Harwood	Won
Golden Globe Awards	Best Non-English Language Film		Won
Golden Globe Awards	Best Director	Julian Schnabel	Won
Golden Globe Awards	Best Screenplay	Ronald Harwood	Nominated
Cannes Film Festival	Best Director	Julian Schnabel	Won
Cannes Film Festival	Golden Palm	Julian Schnabel	Nominated
Cannes Film Festival	Vulcan Award	Janusz Kamiński	Won
César Awards	Best Film	Jérôme Seydoux and Julian Schnabel	Nominated
César Awards	Best Director	Julian Schnabel	Nominated
César Awards	Best Actor	Mathieu Amalric	Won
César Awards	Best Adaptation	Ronald Harwood	Nominated
César Awards	Best Cinematography	Janusz Kamiński	Nominated
César Awards	Best Editing	Juliette Welfling	Won
César Awards	Best Sound	Dominique Gaborieau	Nominated
National Board of Review	Best International Film		Won
Boston Society of Film Critics	Best Film		Runner-up
Boston Society of Film Critics	Best Foreign Language Film		Won
Boston Society of Film Critics	Best Director	Julian Schnabel	Won
Boston Society of Film Critics	Best Screenplay	Ronald Harwood	Runner-up
Boston Society of Film Critics	Best Cinematography	Janusz Kamiński	Won
New York Film Critics Online	Best Picture		Won (Note: tie with There Will Be Blood)
Los Angeles Film Critics Association	Best Film		Runner-up
Los Angeles Film Critics Association	Best Foreign Language Film		Runner-up
Los Angeles Film Critics Association	Best Director	Julian Schnabel	Runner-up
Los Angeles Film Critics Association	Best Cinematography	Janusz Kamiński	Won
Prix Jacques Prévert du Scénario	Best Adaptation	Ronald Harwood	Won
Washington D.C. Area Film Critics Association	Best Foreign Language Film		Won
San Francisco Film Critics Circle	Best Foreign Language Film		Won
American Film Institute Awards	Top Ten AFI Movies of the Year		2nd place
Satellite Awards	Best Cinematography	Janusz Kamiński	Won
Alliance of Women Film Journalists	Best Film		Nominated
Alliance of Women Film Journalists	Best Foreign Film		Won
Alliance of Women Film Journalists	Best Director	Julian Schnabel	Nominated
Alliance of Women Film Journalists	Best Screenplay, Adapted	Ronald Harwood	Nominated
Alliance of Women Film Journalists	Best Editing	Juliette Welfling	Won
Alliance of Women Film Journalists	Outstanding Achievement by a Woman in 2007	Kathleen Kennedy (Also for Persepolis)	Won
Toronto Film Critics Association	Best Foreign Language Film		runner-up
Belgian Film Critics Association	Grand Prix		Nominated
Directors Guild of America	Outstanding Directorial Achievement in Theatrical Feature Film	Julian Schnabel	Nominated
