= Semantic compaction =

Language representation method

Semantic compaction, (Minspeak), conceptually described as polysemic (multi-meaning) iconic encoding, is one of the three ways to represent language in Augmentative and alternative communication (AAC). It is a system utilized in AAC devices in which sequences of icons (pictorial symbols) are combined in order to form a word or a phrase. The goal is to increase independent communication in individuals who cannot use speech. Minspeak is the only patented system for Semantic Compaction and is based on multi-meaning icons that code vocabulary in short sequences determined by rule-driven patterns. Minspeak has been used with both children and adults with various disabilities, including cerebral palsy, motor speech disorders, developmental disabilities, autism spectrum disorder, and adult onset disabilities such as Amyotrophic Lateral Sclerosis (ALS).

== History ==
Bruce Baker was the first to develop the idea of sequencing picture symbols as an encoding system which he patented under the name of Minspeak. His desire to develop this system stemmed from his doctorate work in linguistics, which focused on the language used to describe and interact with people with disabilities. During interviews with AAC users, he noticed the linguistic capabilities provided by the devices were very primitive at the time, excluding any modern linguistic insights. As a result, Baker developed a rudimentary coding system used during these interviews to facilitate more optimal communication. This coding system served as the impetus for development of the Minspeak program.

Inspired by his work with ancient hieroglyphic writing systems, he envisioned a communication program in which a group of ideas could be represented by one single picture. The specific idea that the user wished to convey would be determined by the context or sequence in which the picture was used. As a result, he began developing a computer system using inputs from multi-meaning pictures in a variety of ways that would allow the user access to a wide array of language. These multi-meaning pictures would maximize the user's current communication abilities and facilitate information exchange in an economical way.

Baker's preliminary work for Minspeak included forty icons. The first was a picture of an ear, representing phatic exchanges (communication devoid of information exchange, i.e. "what’s up"). Other icons were selected to represent additional speech functions. In 1981, Baker and one of this former students, Kenneth Smith, implemented the first Minspeak program on an AIM 65 computer using a Votrax SC01 voice synthesizer. In December 1981, Baker teamed with Barry Romich and signed his first commercial agreement for Minspeak. This led to the development of the Minspeak program on Express III hardware in the summer of 1982. Minspeak was released to the public for commercial use at the American Speech-Language and Hearing Association (ASHA) Convention of 1983 in Cincinnati, Ohio. From that point forward, Minspeak evolved into a dynamic communication system, advancing its capabilities to serve a more diverse user population and to establish an efficient language approach to augmentative and alternative communication.

== Conceptual basis ==
Minspeak is an encoding system based on the idea of sequencing picture symbols. This system is governed by a specific set of rules and uses iconic encoding, indicating that there is not a one-to-one correspondence between a symbol and its meaning. As the symbols typically contain a variety of details, each symbol may be associated with multiple meanings. The meaning is defined by combining pictures in short sequences, and these sequences follow patterns. For example, the rainbow icon combines with other icons to denote colors, such as "rainbow" and "apple" combining to signify the word "red." Therefore, Minspeak operates as a system of symbols, and not as a set of symbols, because it allows for the creation of "novel" concepts not explicitly expressed by each symbol, but rather by the combination of existing symbols. For example, a Minspeak symbol depicting a dog holding a newspaper can also represent the concepts "dog", "pet" and "bring/get", depending on the other symbols with which it is combined. Minspeak provides a means of coding language whereby specific combinations of symbols generate specific messages.

In order to facilitate vocabulary recall, this system uses a rule-based system of ordering the pictures. Minspeak concepts can also be used with pre-programmed vocabulary sets called Minspeak Application Programs (MAPs) and later these messages and symbol combinations may be determined by the AAC user themself if desired. MAPs are used as initial starter vocabulary sets until this later customization is done by the user, and additional keys may be added by the user as their knowledge expands. Nonspeaking individuals using Minspeak software must be able to logically sequence encoded picture sequences together.

== Usage and Learnability ==
Minspeak uses a core vocabulary. A core vocabulary encompasses syntactic function words and has limited usage of nouns as compared to traditional Single Meaning Picture sets in AAC. For example, pronouns and demonstratives (syntactic function words) are used more frequently than specific nouns, such as "dog", "pizza", or "flower". Core vocabulary represents the majority (73–90%) of words used by toddlers and preschool children. Mastery of core words is essential for the mastery of semantics, early syntax of 1 and 2-word phrases, basic morphology, and question structure.

Unity is a Minspeak software program that operates based on the idea that 400 core words make up the majority of spoken language and that additional words are part of a fringe vocabulary. Unity teaches preschool children language concepts using single picture symbols. Initially, each picture in the system represents one word, but a more advanced communicator can combine short sequences of pictures to create words or phrase. Unity has three levels which progress from beginning to advanced communicators, ranging from an initial icon set of 45 symbols and progressing up to an icon set of 144 symbols. These symbol systems use categorization and association to create symbol sequences. The most commonly used core words are found on the main screen of the Unity system, with additional screens featuring less common core and fringe vocabulary words. Part of Speech Markers may also be used in this symbol set, such that the concept "Hot" is generated by a sequence containing a symbol and the Part of Speech Marker "Adjective". Unity also gives the user the opportunity to add his or her own words to the system's fringe vocabulary. If the user wants to add a word such as "magnificent" that is not already included in the fringe vocabulary, the user can utilize the meanings of existing icons to derive the new word. For example, combining the icon "elephant" symbolizes something large and the icon "sunrise" symbolizes something bright or beautiful. Users are able to program these two icons in sequence to represent the word "magnificent".

Words Strategy is a Minspeak software program that uses a more advanced form of iconic encoding, designed for the adolescent or adult AAC user who is able to combine words into more complex sentence sequences using picture-grammar symbol sequences. This application allows for the generation of more than 2,500 words using this sequencing format.

Motor learning is an important component of becoming a fluent semantic compaction user. Consistent icon sequencing to produce a word should be considered throughout the process of learning to use semantic compaction devices. The Language Acquisition through Motor Planning (LAMP) strategy aids individuals in developing motor plans paired with auditory output to represent words. Minspeak relies upon the motor-based learning principles that when motor patterns are repeated, these processes become automatic and simplified. Common automated motor patterns include typing on a keyboard without looking, riding a bicycle, or swallowing food and drink. Increased automaticity and simplification with the production of language allows experienced Minspeak users to delegate cognitive attention to their intended message (language) instead of to the formulation of their message. This allows users to focus on communicating a specific message rather than focus on how to build the message by searching for icons across different pages and or screens. The use of LAMP strategies has been associated with increased natural expression through unique combinations of words in non-verbal children with autism. Ideally, once the system of Minspeak is mastered, productions of communication should take less time and effort across communication contexts.

There have been a limited number of studies reviewing the efficacy of using semantic compaction. Few studies have investigated how young children learn and use Minspeak. Two of these studies have shown that semantic compaction strategies are challenging for typically developing children who are 2–5 years old given after receiving only four training sessions. Although a group of four- and five-year-old children increased their ability to use iconic encoding after four learning sessions, they were less accurate vocabulary children using other methods of organizing vocabulary such as by category, or on a visual scene. The researchers proposed several possible reasons for the children's difficulties including "a possible lack of understanding of the semantic associations of the icons; a lack of conceptual knowledge required to understand multiple associations; and limited knowledge of parts of speech (several icon combinations required the use of a speech marker for adjective, preposition, and interjection)." A follow-up study found that icon prediction, in which the options available for selection are highlighted, did not help children to locate vocabulary more accurately, but there was some evidence that the use of icon prediction may facilitate generalization of semantic compaction strategies to new vocabulary items.

On the other hand, there is research that indicates that intensive teaching (including practice outside of therapy sessions) can improve young children's ability to use semantic compaction accurately. A case study of a 3-year-old girl with cerebral palsy revealed that intensive, systematic training involving the client, family members, therapists, and educational teams can make it possible to achieve marked progress in early language skills while learning and using a Minspeak device. Learnability of Minspeak systems may heavily depend on the quality of its teaching and how often it is used with a specific child.

== Literacy ==
Literacy is communication in all forms such as listening, speaking, reading, and writing. Literacy development begins in infancy and continues to mature into adulthood. Literacy plays an important role in the success of academic, social, and professional development. Literacy skills are not a prerequisite to utilizing a semantic compaction system, however this system can be used to promote the development of literacy skills. Essential components of literacy development include phonological awareness, vocabulary development, phonics, word identification, and comprehension. Semantic compaction is a rule driven system that supports the development of literacy through vocabulary development, morphology development, and comprehension. In addition, the icons can be used to help teach phonological awareness. For example, when teaching phonological awareness and segmenting initial sounds the instructor will say a phoneme and visually present the phoneme at the same time. Then the student will point to a picture that starts with that phoneme. To develop literacy skills, semantic compaction systems needs to be paired with an instructional program that meets the unique needs of the person using AAC.

Intensive home and school training with the use of Minspeak had a strong effect (effect size=1.16) on literacy skills in a three-year-old girl with cerebral palsy.

== Language System Comparisons ==
Semantic Compaction uses short symbol sequences and provides a single overlay to diminish the need of switching screens to find additional vocabulary items. The vocabulary icons provide multiple meanings which reduce the need for a large symbol set. The chart below compares 3 common methods used to represent language on an AAC device:

| | Literacy | Length of symbol combination | Number of symbols required | Symbol sequence length | Promotes message automacticity |
|---|---|---|---|---|---|
| Single Meaning Pictures | Not required | Short | Large | Short | No |
| Alphabet-Based Systems | Required | Long | Small | Long | Yes |
| Semantic Compaction | Not required | Short | Small | relatively short | Yes |

Three advantages of semantic compaction over single meaning pictures and alphabet-based systems are that a user need not be literate, symbol combinations are limited to up to just 3 at a time, and fewer symbols are required on the screen or device than with other AAC devices. A disadvantage of semantic compaction is that the user must be able to memorize codes; if a user is not cognitively capable of linking multiple icons together, he or she will not benefit from the semantic compaction system. A single-meaning icon set would be more appropriate.
