= Pictogram =

Ideogram that conveys its meaning through its pictorial resemblance to a physical object

Sampling of US National Park Service pictograms

A pictogram (also pictogramme, pictograph, or simply picto) is a graphic symbol that conveys meaning through its visual resemblance to a physical object. Pictograms are used in systems of writing and visual communication. A pictography is a writing system which uses pictograms. Some pictograms, such as hazard pictograms, may be elements of formal languages.

In the field of prehistoric art, the term "pictograph" has a different definition, and specifically refers to art painted on rock surfaces. Pictographs are contrasted with petroglyphs, which are carved or incised.

Small pictograms displayed on a computer screen in order to help the user navigate are called icons.

== Historical ==
Early written symbols were based on pictograms (pictures which resemble what they signify) and ideograms (symbols which represent ideas). Ancient Sumerian, Egyptian, and Chinese civilizations began to adapt such symbols to represent concepts, developing them into logographic writing systems. Pictograms are still in use as the main medium of written communication in some non-literate cultures in Africa, the Americas, and Oceania. Pictograms are often used as simple, pictorial, representational symbols by most contemporary cultures.

Pictograms can be considered an art form, or can be considered a written language and are designated as such in Pre-Columbian art, Native American art, Ancient Mesopotamia and Painting in the Americas before Colonization. One example of many is the Rock art of the Chumash people, part of the Native American history of California. In 2011, UNESCO's World Heritage List added "Petroglyph Complexes of the Mongolian Altai, Mongolia" to celebrate the importance of the pictograms engraved in rocks.

Some scientists in the field of neuropsychiatry and neuropsychology, such as Mario Christian Meyer, are studying the symbolic meaning of indigenous pictographs and petroglyphs, aiming to create new ways of communication between native people and modern scientists to safeguard and valorize their cultural diversity.

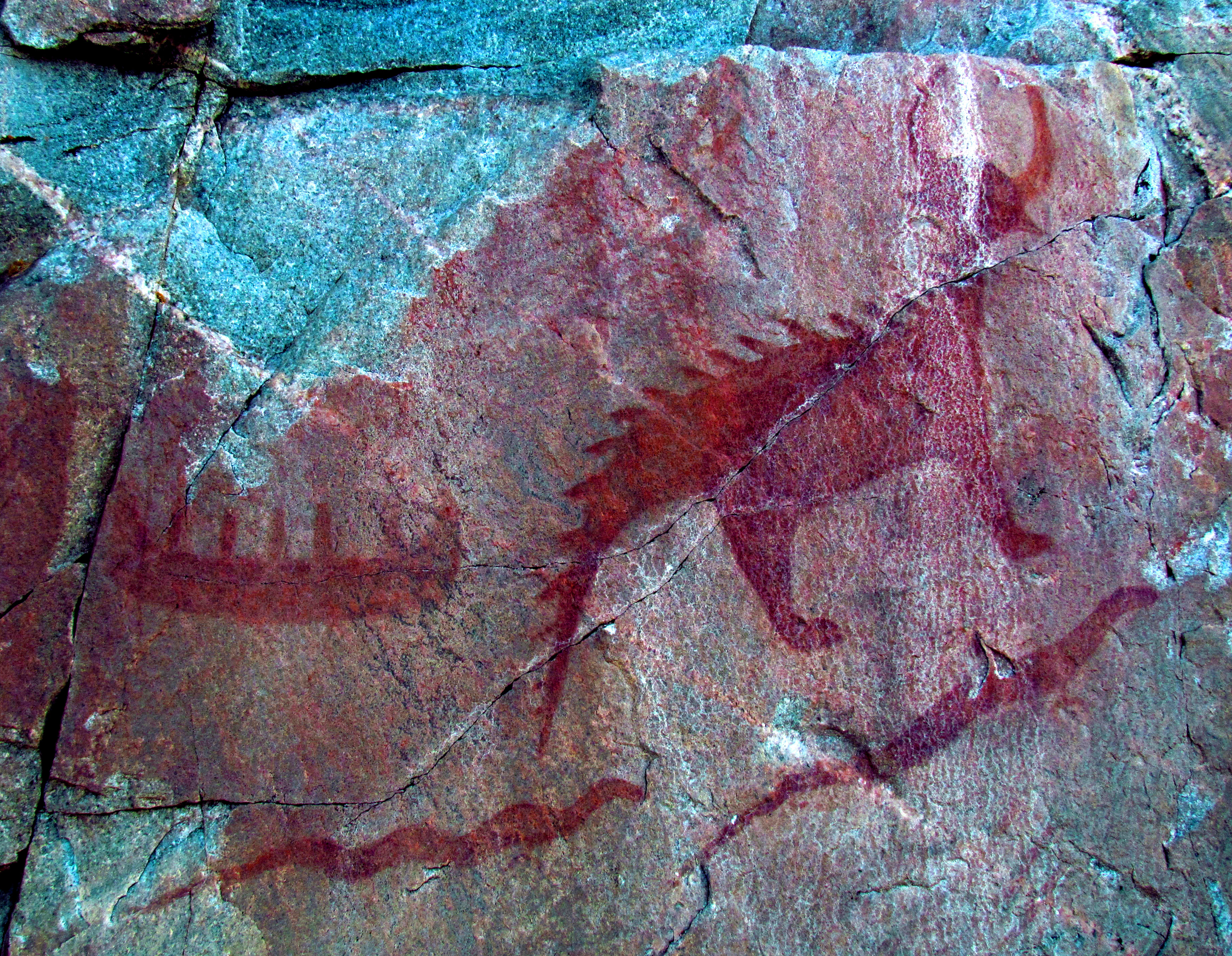
Ojibwa pictographs on cliff-face at Agawa Rock, Lake Superior Provincial Park of a boat and Mishipeshu, an animal with horns, painted with red ochre

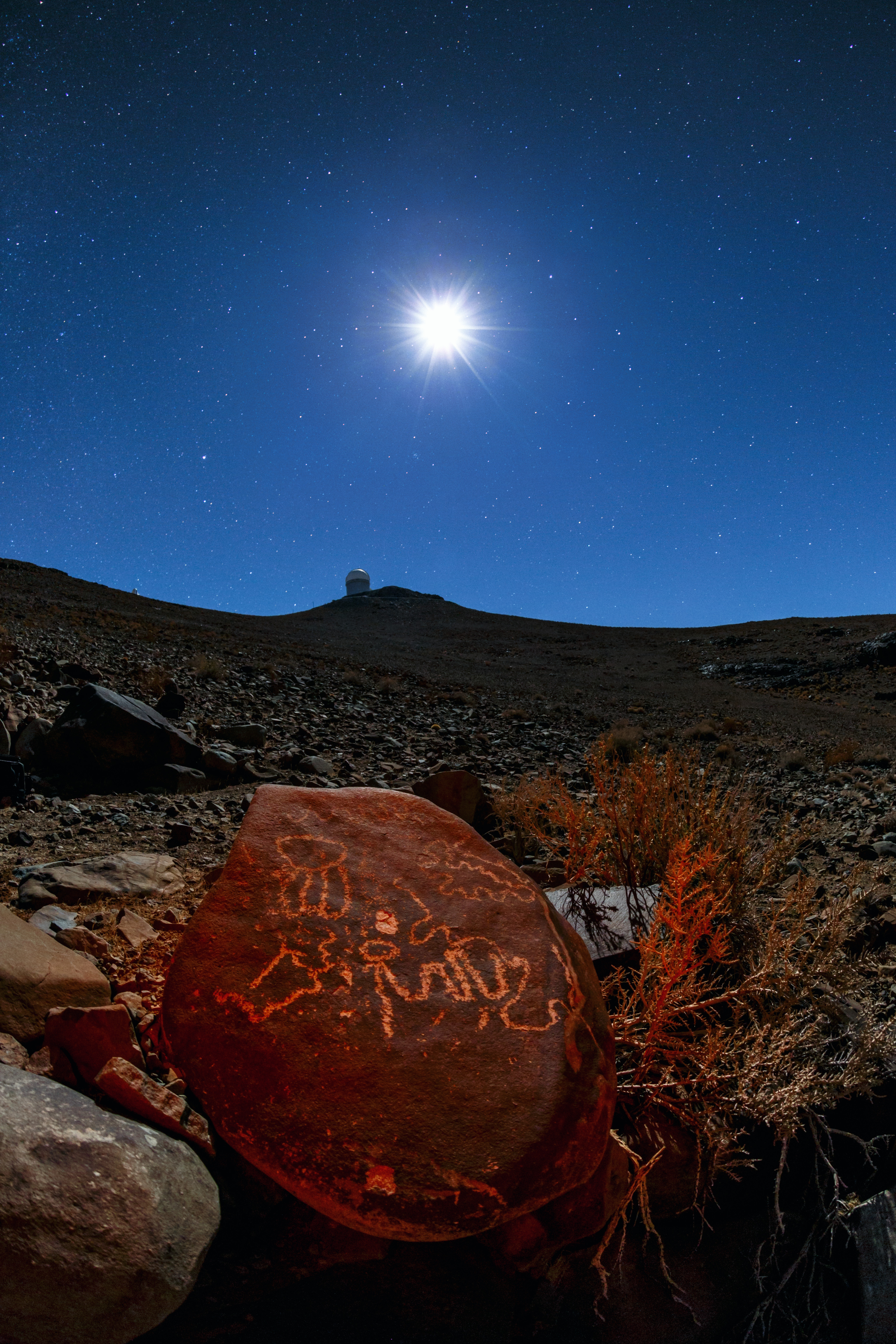
Several prehistoric engravings can be found around La Silla Observatory.

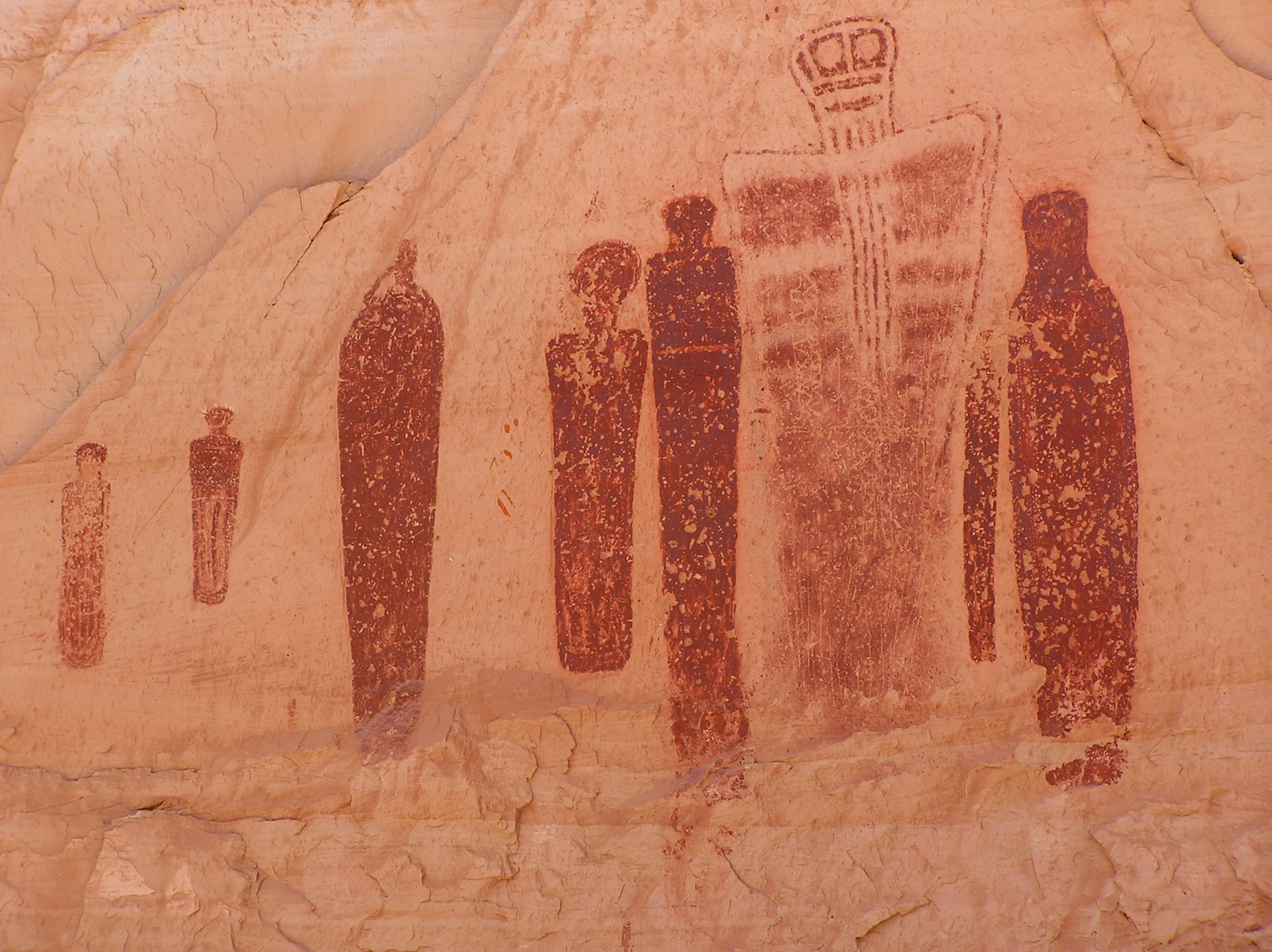
Native American pictographs from the Great Gallery, Horseshoe Canyon, Canyonlands National Park

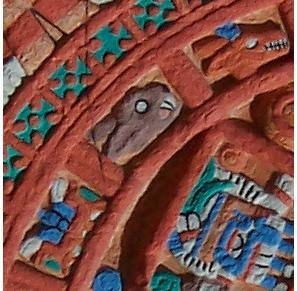
Water, rabbit, deer pictograms on a replica of an Aztec Sun Stone

== Modern uses ==
An early modern example of the extensive use of pictograms may be seen in the map in the London suburban timetables of the London and North Eastern Railway, 1936–1947, designed by George Dow, in which a variety of pictograms were used to indicate facilities available at or near each station. Pictograms remain in common use today, serving as pictorial, representational signs, instructions, or statistical diagrams. Because of their graphical nature and fairly realistic style, they are widely used to indicate public toilets, or places such as airports and train stations. Because they are a concise way to communicate a concept to people who speak many different languages, pictograms have also been used extensively at the Olympics since the 1964 summer games in Tokyo featured designs by Masaru Katsumi. Later Olympic pictograms have been redesigned for each set of games.

Pictographic writing as a modernist poetic technique is credited to Ezra Pound, though French surrealists credit the Pacific Northwest American Indians of Alaska who introduced writing, via totem poles, to North America.

Contemporary artist Xu Bing created Book from the Ground, a universal language made up of pictograms collected from around the world. A Book from the Ground chat program has been exhibited in museums and galleries internationally.

Emojis are a type of pictogram.

== In mathematics ==
A compound pictogram showing the breakdown of the survivors and deaths of the maiden voyage of the RMS Titanic by class and age/gender

In statistics, pictograms are charts in which icons represent numbers to make it more interesting and easier to understand. A key is often included to indicate what each icon represents. All icons must be of the same size, but a fraction of an icon can be used to show the respective fraction of that amount.

For example, the following table:

Day	Letters sent
Monday	10
Tuesday	17
Wednesday	29
Thursday	41
Friday	18

can be graphed as follows:

Day	Letters sent
Monday	one envelope
Tuesday	one envelope and a half
Wednesday	three envelopes
Thursday	four envelopes
Friday	two envelopes

Key: = 10 letters; = 5 letters
As the values are rounded to the nearest 5 letters, the second icon on Tuesday is the left half of the original.

== In medicine and agriculture ==
Miscommunication, for example due to language barriers or cognitive impairment, is a relevant factor for misdiagnosis in medicine. Pictograms and other forms of visual aids have therefore been used to ease communication and improve patient care, for example by ensuring medication adherence. Reviews found especially pronounced effects in low-literacy patients.

There is regular use of pictograms for products used in agriculture to aid hazard recognition, and also to advise on the correct usage of agrochemicals for agricultural workers with limited reading skills. This is often a national legal requirement, and many pictograms are standard throughout the industry.

== Standardization ==
Pictograms can often transcend languages in that they can communicate to speakers of a number of tongues and language families equally effectively, even if the languages and cultures are completely different. This is why road signs and similar pictographic material are often applied as global standards expected to be understood by nearly all.

A standard set of pictograms was defined in the international standard ISO 7001: Public Information Symbols. Other common sets of pictographs are the laundry symbols used on clothing tags and the chemical hazard symbols as standardized by the GHS system.

Pictograms have been popularized in use on the Internet and in software, better known as "icons" displayed on a computer screen in order to help user navigate a computer system or mobile device.

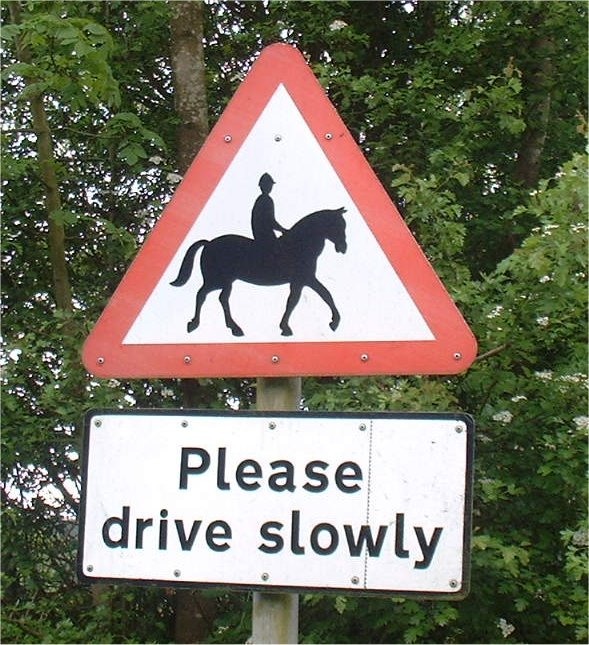
A pictographic traffic sign (top) warning motorists of horses and riders

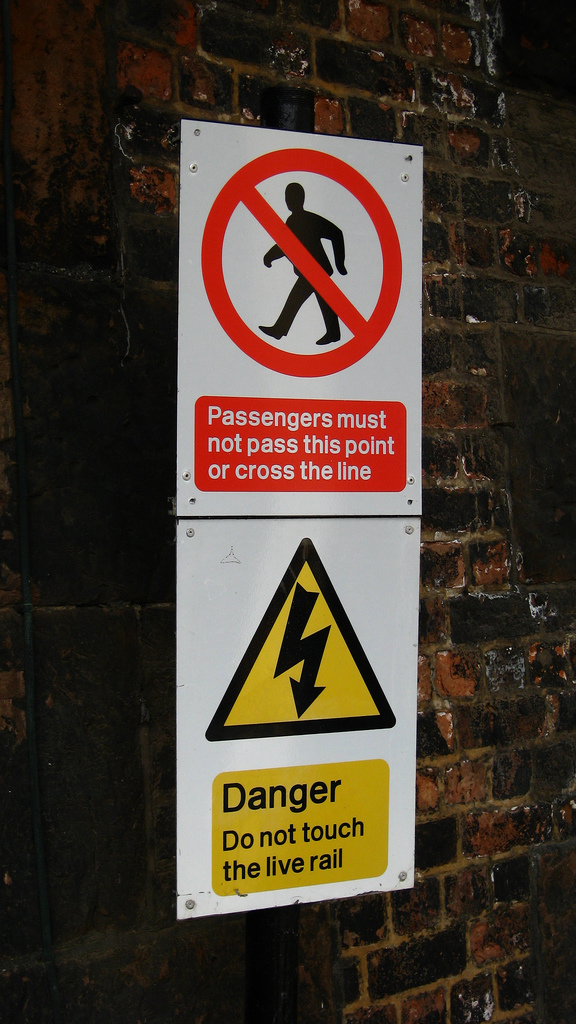
British Rail passenger safety pictograms at the end of the platform at Meols railway station

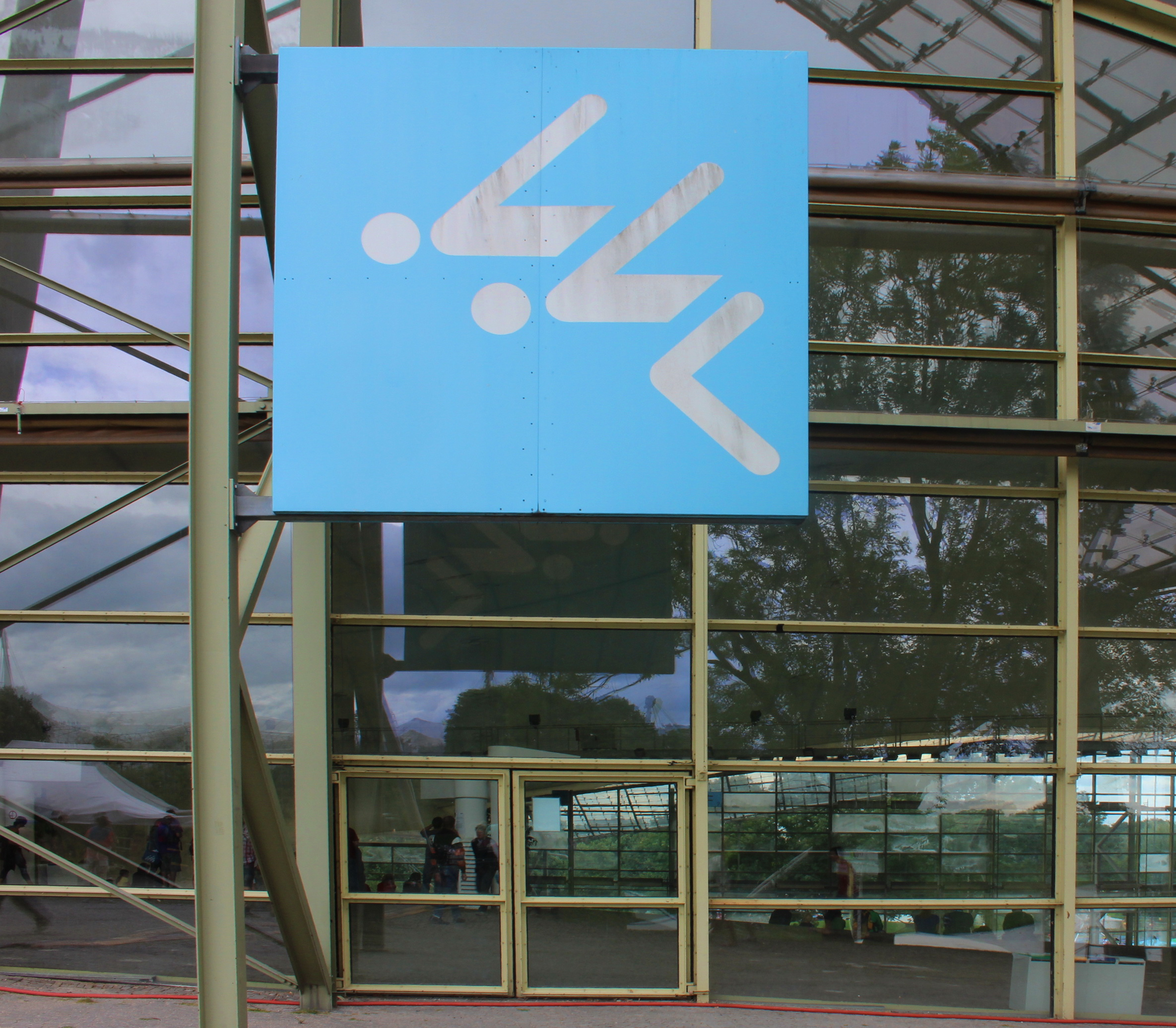
This highly influential pictogram design was introduced at the 1972 Munich Olympics, although pictograms first began to appear in the games at Tokyo in 1964.

== See also ==
- Blissymbols
- Bouba/kiki effect
- Crop art
- Emoticon
- Emoji
- Globally Harmonized System of hazard pictograms
- Icon (computing)
- Ideasthesia
- Ideogram
- Label
- List of Stone Age art
- List of symbols
- List of writing systems § Pictographic/ideographic writing systems
- Pecked curvilinear nucleated
- Petroform
- Petroglyph
- Pointy-talky card
- Rebus
- Road sign
- Rock art
- Rock art of the Chumash people
- Sound symbolism
- Stick figure, in art
- Symbol
- Traffic sign
- Warning sign
- Yakima Indian Painted Rocks
