= Janice Light =

American academic

Janice Light is an American academic who held the Hintz Family Endowed Chair in Children's Communicative Competence in the Department of Communication Sciences and Disorders at Pennsylvania State University. As a Distinguished Professor, she taught graduate courses and seminars in augmentative and alternative communication (AAC) and developed an internationally recognized research program in AAC.

== Field of interest ==
Light's primary interest has been furthering understanding of the development of communicative competence, language, and literacy skills by individuals with complex communication needs who require AAC.

Light has been the principal investigator on more than 20 federally funded research grants to improve outcomes for individuals who use AAC (totaling more than $10 million). She is currently the Principal Investigator for the Rehabilitation Engineering Research Center on Augmentative and Alternative Communication (RERC on AAC), a virtual research consortium funded by the National Institute for Disability and Rehabilitation Research. She is the author of more than 80 peer-reviewed papers, book chapters, and books.

Light's early work focused on the nature of interaction between persons who use AAC and their communication partners, and resulted in her proposal of a definition for communicative competence in AAC, including four social purposes of communicative interaction in AAC: the expression of needs and wants to a listener, the transfer of information as in more general conversation, the development of social closeness through such things as jokes and cheering, and finally social etiquette practices such as "please" and "thank you". These four purposes vary in terms of the relative importance of the content, rate, duration and the focus of the interaction. It is important that the AAC systems selected also reflect the priorities of the individual and their family.

More recently, Light's work has focused on the development of communication systems for very young children with complex communication needs in order to support language and literacy needs, as well as work to support the translation of knowledge to practice in these areas.

Light was a co-editor of the journal Augmentative and Alternative Communication (the official journal of the International Society for Augmentative and Alternative Communication) with Dr. David McNaughton from 2012 to 2015.

== Awards ==
Light has received the Don Johnston Distinguished Lecturer award from the International Society for Augmentative and Alternative Communication, the Dorothy Jones Barnes Outstanding Teaching Award, the Penn State Teaching Hall of Fame award, the Journal of Augmentative and Alternative Communication Editor's Award, the Helen G. and Evan G. Patishall Outstanding Research Achievement Award, the Pauline Schmitt Russell Distinguished Research Career Award, the Penn State University Faculty Scholar Medal for Outstanding Achievement in the Social and Behavioral Sciences, and the 2013 President's Award for Academic Integration.

== Selected publications ==
- Light, J., & McNaughton, D. (2014). Communicative competence for individuals who require augmentative and alternative communication: A new definition for a new era of communication?. Augmentative and Alternative Communication, 30, 1–18.
- McNaughton, D., & Light, J. (2013). The iPad and mobile technology revolution: Benefits and challenges for individuals who require augmentative and alternative communication. Augmentative and Alternative Communication, 29, 107–116.
- Light, J., & McNaughton, D. (2012). The changing face of augmentative and alternative communication: Past, present, and future challenges. Augmentative and Alternative Communication, 28, 197–204.
- Light, J. & McNaughton, D. (2009). Accessible literacy learning: Evidence-based reading instruction for learners with autism, cerebral palsy, Down syndrome, and other disabilities. San Diego, CA: Mayer Johnson.
- Light, J., & McNaughton, D. (2009). Addressing the literacy demands of the curriculum for conventional and more advanced readers and writers who require AAC. In G. Soto & C. Zangari (Eds.), Practically speaking: Language, literacy, and academic development for students with AAC needs (pp. 217–245). Baltimore, MD: Paul H. Brookes Publishing Co.
- Light, J.; McNaughton, D.; Weyer, M.; Karg, L. (2008). "Evidence-Based Literacy Instruction for Individuals Who Require Augmentative and Alternative Communication: A Case Study of a Student with Multiple Disabilities". Seminars in Speech and Language. 29 (2): 120–132. doi:10.1055/s-2008-1079126. PMID 18645914.
- McNaughton, D.; Rackensperger, T.; Benedek, E.; Krezman, C.; Williams, M.B.; Light, J. (2008). ""A child needs to be given a chance to succeed": Parents of individuals who use AAC describe the benefits and challenges of learning AAC technologies". Augmentative and Alternative Communication. 24 (1): 43–55. doi:10.1080/07434610701421007. PMID 18256963. S2CID 14829729.
- Light, J., Page, R., Curran, J., & Pitkin, L. (2007). Children's ideas for the design of AAC assistive technologies for young children with complex communication needs. Augmentative and Alternative Communication, 16, 1–14.
- Light, J. (1988). Interaction involving individuals using augmentative and alternative communication systems: State of the art and future directions. Augmentative and Alternative Communication, 4, 66–82.
- Light, J. (1989). Toward a definition of communicative competence for individuals using augmentative and alternative communication systems. Augmentative and Alternative Communication, 5, 137–144.
