= Pointy-talky card =

Language translation sheet that can be pointed at to communicate

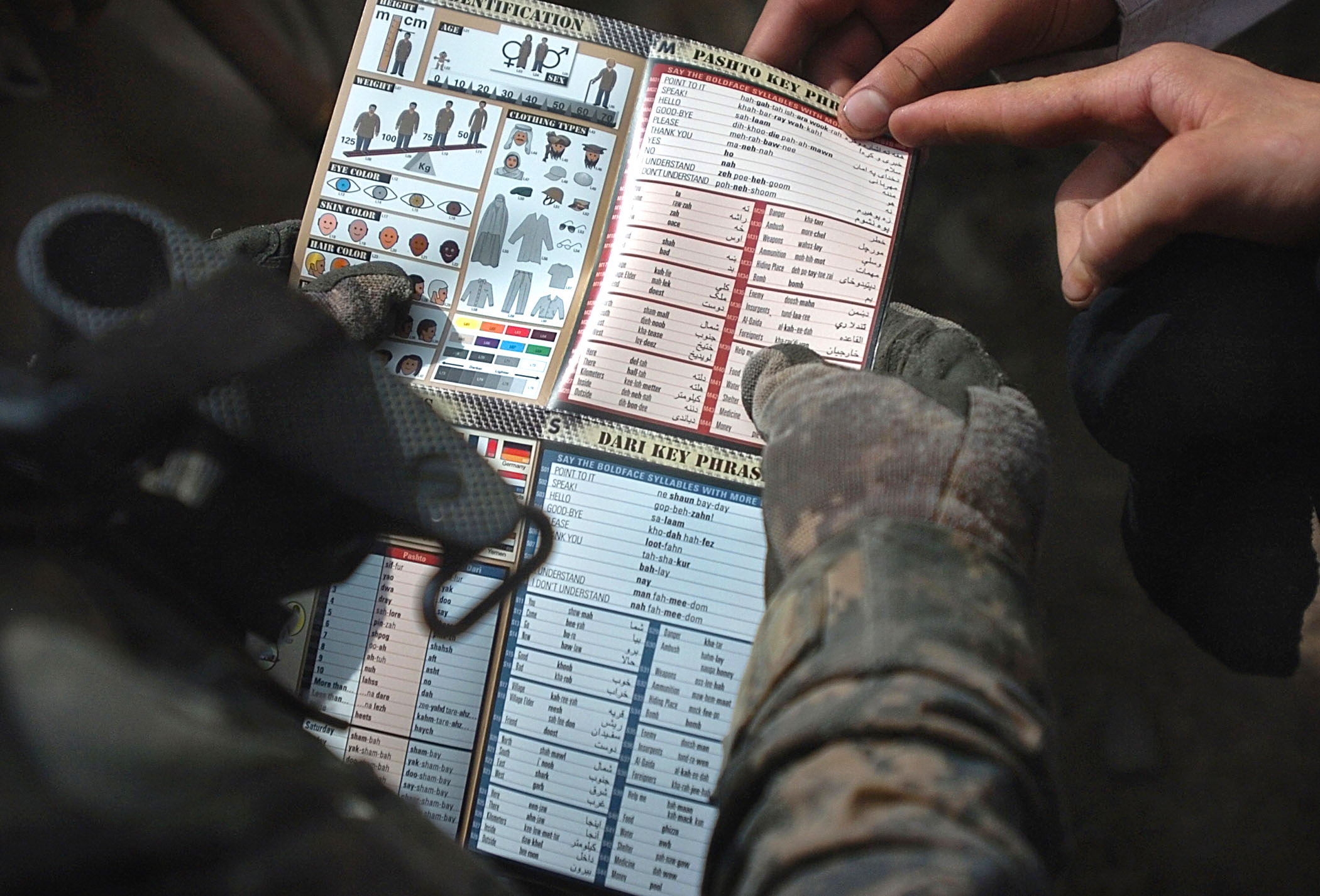
A US Military point-talk card used in Afghanistan, with the upper left corner being used to describe an individual by indicating their height, eye color, etc. by pointing

A pointy-talky card or point talk card is a sheet used for communication between people who do not share a mutual language, on which the people conversing can point at the pictograph or dual-language phrase that conveys their message. During World War II, memoirs of US servicemen mention using such cards to indicate phrases in Chinese and in French. Point talk cards are also used by police and emergency services personnel to communicate with people who do not speak the authority's language.

== See also ==
- Augmentative and alternative communication
