= Boston Society of Film Critics Awards 2007 =

Annual US film awards ceremony

28th BSFC Awards

December 11, 2007

Best Film:
No Country for Old Men

The 28th Boston Society of Film Critics Awards, honoring the best in filmmaking in 2007, were given on 11 December 2007.

== Winners ==
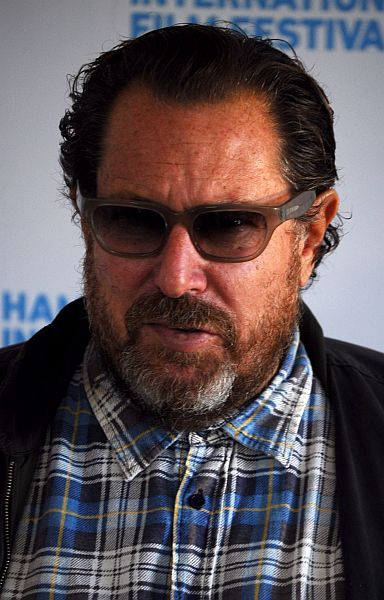
Julian Schnabel, Best Director winner

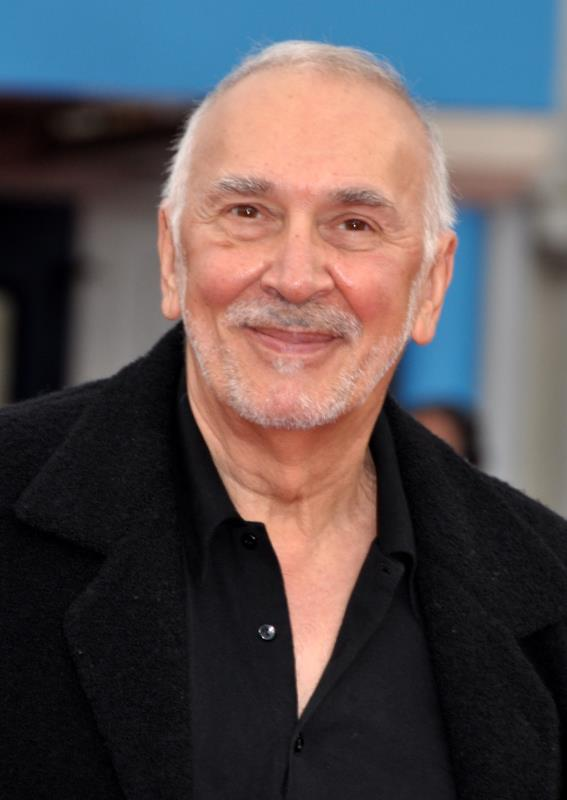
Frank Langella, Best Actor winner

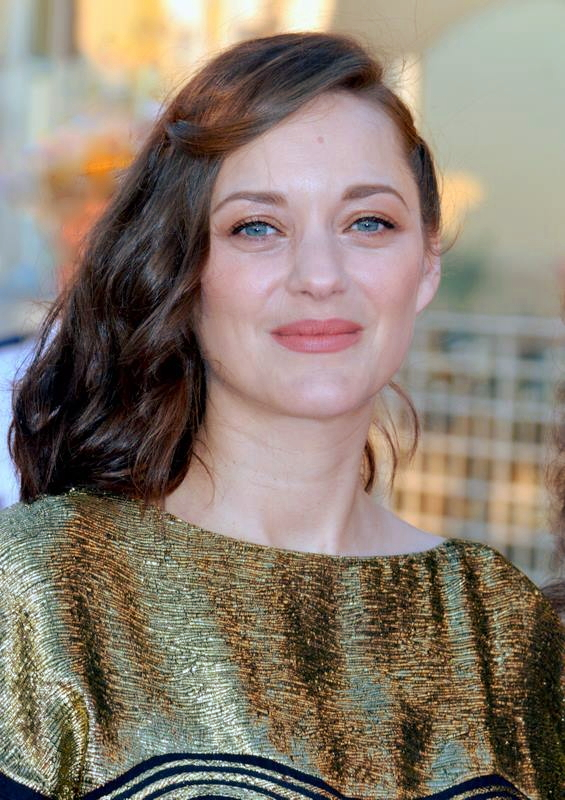
Marion Cotillard, Best Actress winner

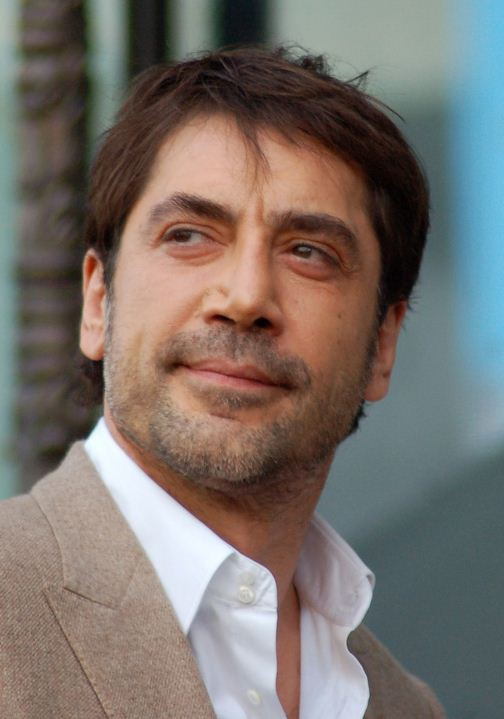
Javier Bardem, Best Supporting Actor winner

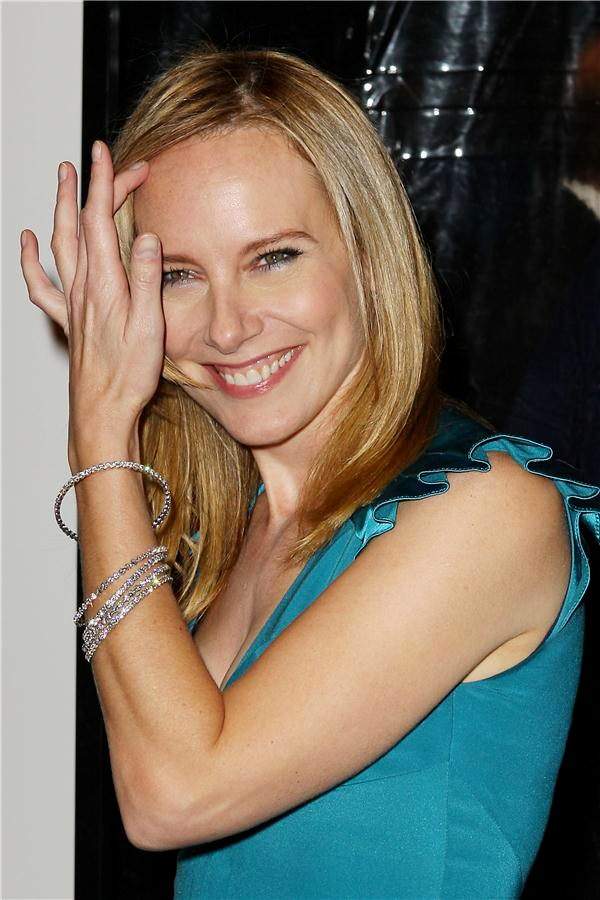
Amy Ryan, Best Supporting Actress winner

- Best Film:
  - No Country for Old Men
  - Runner-up: The Diving Bell and the Butterfly (Le scaphandre et le papillon)
- Best Actor:
  - Frank Langella – Starting Out in the Evening
  - Runner-up: Daniel Day-Lewis – There Will Be Blood
- Best Actress:
  - Marion Cotillard – La Vie en Rose (La môme)
  - Runner-up: Julie Christie – Away from Her
- Best Supporting Actor:
  - Javier Bardem – No Country for Old Men
  - Runner-up: Ben Foster – 3:10 to Yuma and Alpha Dog
- Best Supporting Actress:
  - Amy Ryan – Gone Baby Gone
  - Runner-up: Cate Blanchett – I'm Not There
- Best Director:
  - Julian Schnabel – The Diving Bell and the Butterfly (Le scaphandre et le papillon)
  - Runner-up: Joel Coen and Ethan Coen – No Country for Old Men
- Best Screenplay:
  - Brad Bird – Ratatouille
  - Runner-up: Ronald Harwood – The Diving Bell and the Butterfly (Le scaphandre et le papillon)
- Best Cinematography:
  - Janusz Kamiński – The Diving Bell and the Butterfly (Le scaphandre et le papillon)
  - Runner-up: Roger Deakins – The Assassination of Jesse James by the Coward Robert Ford, In the Valley of Elah, and No Country for Old Men
- Best Documentary:
  - Crazy Love
  - Runner-up: The King of Kong: A Fistful of Quarters
- Best Foreign-Language Film:
  - The Diving Bell and the Butterfly (Le scaphandre et le papillon) • France/United States
- Best New Filmmaker:
  - Ben Affleck – Gone Baby Gone
  - Runner-up: Tony Gilroy – Michael Clayton
- Best Ensemble Cast:
  - Before the Devil Knows You're Dead
  - Runner-up: I'm Not There and Superbad (TIE)
