= Jean-Dominique Bauby =

French writer and editor (1952–1997)

- Bauby, blinking, to Claude Mendibil, transcribing, 1996
- Born: 23 April 1952; Paris, France
- Died: 9 March 1997 (aged 44); Berck-sur-Mer, Nord-Pas de Calais, France
- Occupations: Journalist, editor, writer
- Children: 2
- Writing career
- Language: French
- Notable work: The Diving Bell and the Butterfly

Jean-Dominique Bauby (French: [ʒɑ̃ dɔminik bobi]; 23 April 1952 – 9 March 1997) was a French journalist, author and editor of the French fashion magazine Elle. After developing locked-in syndrome in 1995 following a debilitating stroke, he dictated a memoir, The Diving Bell and the Butterfly, using a system of communication based on blinking.

== Early life and career ==
Bauby was born in the 14th arrondissement of Paris, and grew up in the 1st arrondissement of Paris, on Rue du Mont-Thabor, north of the Tuileries Garden, living in the building where Alfred de Musset had lived.

He began his journalism career at Combat and then Le Quotidien de Paris. He received his first by-line the day Georges Pompidou died in 1974. At age 28, he was promoted to editor-in-chief of the daily Le Matin de Paris, before becoming editor of the cultural section of Paris Match. He then joined the editorial staff of Elle, and later became the magazine's editor.

Bauby was in a relationship with Sylvie de la Rochefoucauld for ten years. They had a son and a daughter together. They separated when he began a relationship with Florence Ben Sadoun, also a journalist at Elle.

== Memoir ==
On 8 December 1995, at the age of 43, Bauby had a stroke while driving his son to a night out at the theatre. When he woke up in the hospital 20 days later, he could only blink his left eyelid. He had locked-in syndrome, in which the mental faculties remain intact but most of the body is paralyzed. In Bauby's case, his mouth, arms, and legs were paralyzed, and he lost 27 kilograms (60 lb) in the first 20 weeks after his stroke.

Before his stroke, Bauby had signed a contract to write a book. His speech therapist, Sandrine Fichou, arranged a 26-letter alphabet according to the frequency of use so he could dictate. Claude Mendibil, a ghostwriter and freelance book editor, was sent by his publisher Robert Laffont to take the dictation using a system called partner-assisted scanning. She recited the alphabet until Bauby blinked at the correct letter, and recorded the 130-page manuscript letter by letter over the course of two months, working three hours a day, seven days a week.

The resulting book, The Diving Bell and the Butterfly, was published on Friday, 7 March 1997. It went on to become a number one bestseller across Europe and its total sales are now in the millions. At the age of 44, Bauby died from pneumonia, two days after the publishing of his book. He is buried in a family grave at the Père-Lachaise cemetery in Paris, France.

== Films ==
A few days after Bauby's death, Bouillon de culture featured the book, and Jean-Jacques Beineix's short documentary, Assigné à résidence about Bauby in the Hôpital maritime de Berck, with the writer and editor, Claude Mendibil, and Bauby's partner, Florence Ben Sadoun.

In 2007, painter and director Julian Schnabel released a film version of The Diving Bell and the Butterfly adapted for the screen by Ronald Harwood. It starred Mathieu Amalric as Bauby. Critically acclaimed, the film received the Best Director Prize at Cannes Film Festival, and Golden Globe Awards for Best Foreign Language Film and Best Director, as well as four Academy Award nominations.

The film was criticized by Bauby's closest circle of friends as not faithful to events and biased in favor of his ex-partner Sylvie de la Rochefoucauld. His late-life partner Florence Ben Sadoun was represented as shunning him after his stroke, although in reality she visited him frequently at the hospital in Berck-sur-Mer where he lived during his final days. Bauby notes her visits in his memoir. Beth Arnold of Salon.com notes:

The film is said to be "based on a true story," which, of course, is from Bauby's book. The problem is that mixing his factually accurate journey through locked-in syndrome with a personal life that has been fictionalized for film has affected real people who were intensely involved in Bauby's life before and after his accident. Now some of his closest friends feel the movie may forever obscure the truth of his life. They fear this collision between art and reality has created a revisionist history that is accepted by filmgoers around the world, and that this is what will remain in the collective cultural memory. For the first time, they are speaking publicly about it. As one of Bauby's friends says, "There's the Real Story. The Film. And the New Real Story."
