= Partner-assisted scanning =

Communication technique for people with disabilities

Partner-assisted scanning or listener-assisted scanning is an augmentative and alternative communication technique used to enable a person with severe speech impairments to communicate. The approach is used with individuals who, due to sickness or disability, have severe motor impairments and good memory and attention skills. It is used as an alternative to direct access (e.g. pointing) to symbols, pictures, or speech generating devices when these are not used.

== Users of partner-assisted scanning ==
Partner-assisted scanning is a technique used with children who have severe motor and communication impairments, and especially those with additional visual impairment, those who do not yet have an established alternative form of communication, or who are unable to use their usual method, perhaps because their electronic speech output device is being repaired. Adults may also use scanning with a partner when they are not using their more high-tech alternative communication device. Partner-assisted scanning can also be the main means of communication for adults in late stages of diseases such as amyotrophic lateral sclerosis (ALS), multiple sclerosis (MS) or those in intensive care.

== Technique ==
In partner-assisted scanning, the communication partner presents messages or letter choices in a sequential fashion to the individual who wishes to communicate something, and the individual then makes their selection. Scanning refers to the process of items presented one after the other, in the same patterns, until a choice is made as the desired item is reached. Items can be presented either visually, by pointing, or auditorily, by speaking.

Efficiency may be increased in visual partner scanning by the partner first pointing to groups of items, such as rows of letters, and once a row has been selected, proceeding to point to all letters in that row until a choice is made. The communicator can spell words this way in order to express what they need to communicate. Similarly, the partner can point to groups of words. Visual scanning may also be accomplished by the partner pointing to pictures, such as those in a personal communication book, using an agreed upon pattern.

The selecting system can be divided into two categories: alphanumeric and choice making. These differ, because in the alphanumeric version you scan through letters and numbers. Choice-making is where you present multiple choices. For example, when asked "Would you like a movie or book?", the communicator indicates a "yes" response. They can do this in a variety of ways, like facial expressions, vocalizations, or body gestures. To determine the best way, one's team of caretakers has to look at the individual's abilities.

Auditory scanning with a partner is often used when the communicator has very poor vision. Groups of letters can be represented by numbers, such as 1=abcdef. The partner lists off the numbers, and once a group is selected, names all letters in that group. Auditory scanning can also be accomplished with lists of novel messages. The partner orally lists the options and then repeats them so the communicator can make a selection. This could be a short list of emotions to inquire as to how someone is feeling (e.g. happy, sad, frustrated). The partner and communicator can memorize many lists, or "menus", with sub-lists covering different topics for communication. It is important that lists are repeated in the same order and with pauses after each item, so that there is time to respond.

Jean-Dominique Bauby, who had locked-in syndrome, used partner-assisted scanning to communicate and to write his book The Diving Bell and the Butterfly.

== Bibliography ==
- Beukelman, D. R. & Mirenda, P. (2005). Augmentative & Alternative Communication: Supporting Children & Adults With Complex Communication Needs. Baltimore: Paul H. Brookes Publishing Company.
- Beukelman, D. R., Garrett K. L., & Yorkston, K. M. (2007). Augmentative Communication Strategies For Adults With Acute Or Chronic Medical Conditions. Baltimore: Paul H. Brookes Publishing Company.

== See also ==
- Augmentative and alternative communication
