= Lámh =

Irish manual communication system

Lámh (/lɔːv/, from the Irish: lámh [l̪ˠaːw], lit. 'hand') is an augmentative and alternative system of manual communication used in Ireland by developmentally disabled and neurodivergent children and adults. Many of the signs are adapted from Irish Sign Language (ISL), used by the Irish Deaf community.

== History ==
Lámh was developed in the early 1980s. It was discussed at the Second European Congress on Sign Language Research in Amsterdam in 1985.

== Features ==
Lámh is not a true sign language, as only a limited number of expressions are possible. There are over 500 signs; speech is always used with signs and only key words in a sentence are signed.

Lámh is intended to encourage eye contact, develop vocabulary, promote attention to movement, and relieve frustration.

== See also ==
- Makaton
- Augmentative and alternative communication
- Disability rights movement
