= Environmental control device =

An environmental control device is a form of electronic assistive technology which enables people with significant disabilities to independently access equipment in their environment e.g. home or hospital.

An environmental control controller is the device that controls the equipment – like a remote control. You can use the controller to select a range of different options. Each option will control a piece of equipment in a certain way – for example: play on a video recorder.

Environmental control is a general term for environmental control systems and controllers and is sometimes abbreviated as EC.

Environmental control devices may be assessed for and provided by the National Health Service. The team involved in the assessment for such technologies may consist of an occupational therapist.
