= Ajit Narayanan =

Inventor of FreeSpeech and Avaz born in 1981

- Born: August 21, 1981 (age 45); India
- Occupation: Inventor
- Known for: FreeSpeech, Avaz app, MIT TR35 awardee
- Website: avazapp.com

Ajit Narayanan (born August 21, 1981) is the inventor of FreeSpeech, a picture language with a deep grammatical structure. He's also the inventor of Avaz, India's first Augmentative and Alternative Communication (AAC) app for children with disabilities. He is a TR35 awardee (2011) and an awardee of the National Award for Empowerment of Persons with Disabilities by the President of India (2010). He is currently employed by Google, as a part of the accessibility team.

== Early life and education ==
Ajit grew up in Chennai, India, and showed an early aptitude for language and mathematics. He went on to study electrical engineering at the Indian Institute of Technology Madras (IIT Madras). During his graduation, he received the Motorola Prize for his academic and extra-curricular activities. During his time at IIT Madras, he was a part of the Institute quiz team, notably captaining the team that won the University Challenge in 2003, and editing the IIT Madras campus magazine, The Fourth Estate. Ajit subsequently moved to the United States, working for several years at American Megatrends.

== FreeSpeech ==
In February 2013, Ajit gave a TED talk on a new linguistic structure called FreeSpeech, and an algorithm called the FreeSpeech engine. FreeSpeech was created in response to a need felt among children with complex communication needs to communicate in multiple languages. FreeSpeech is a semantic map of pictures that represent words. These words are linked together in pairs of question/answer relationships and have pictorial markers for tense, numbers, etc. applied on top of them. The structure's stated aim was to capture 'meaning' rather than 'surface form' of language and then use a set of algorithms (the FreeSpeech engine) to generate grammatical English out of it.

FreeSpeech is language-independent, meaning it uses pictures of objects, actions, and even abstract ideas like the past tense, instead of English words like "I" or "eat". Some shown on the TED talk include a bowl of soup, a person talking, and a small clock with an arrow pointing backwards to signify the past tense of a verb.

FreeSpeech was tested widely among children with special needs such as autism and language impairments to teach them grammar. It is also used by children in the deaf community to learn literacy—a task complicated by the unique grammatical structure of American Sign Language, which is very different from English.

Beyond applications in disability, the Indian government was in talks to license this program to use in some of its schools to teach English, through the Aakash tablet project.

== Avaz ==
In 2010, Ajit invented Avaz. Avaz is an alternative and augmentative communication (AAC) device. It works by generating speech from limited muscle movements like that from the head or hand, and is used by people with speech disorders, such as cerebral palsy, autism, intellectual disability, and aphasia.

Avaz was widely used in India as a communication device and was subsequently converted into an app for the iPad and Android devices. For his invention of Avaz, Ajit received the National Award for Empowerment of Persons with Disabilities in 2010, from the President of India.

== MIT TR35 ==
In 2011, Ajit was named the MIT TR35 "Innovator of the Year" for India. His citation for the award mentioned his work on low-cost speech generating devices:

There are an estimated 10 million people in India who suffer from speech impediments. They may not have speech but they have a lot to say. And they can benefit from Narayanan's device. Avaz is a communication device for people with speech disorders such as cerebral palsy, autism, mental retardation, and aphasia. It works by converting limited muscle movements, such as head or finger movements, into speech. His invention broadly falls under the category of Augmentative and Alternative Communication (AAC) technologies. Though speech generating devices are effective, most AAC devices aren't within the reach of the speech-impaired persons in the developing world and they mostly generate speech in English. This is another deterrent which has prevented these devices from becoming as popular in the developing world. Narayanan's innovation lies in bringing down the cost of the device to one-tenth of the price of similar devices, making it affordable to a wide swath of the Indian disabled population, and making it available in Indian languages.

In 2012, Ajit was named to the global MIT TR35 list, alongside Groupon founder Andrew Mason and Microsoft Photosynth inventor Noah Snavely:

Narayanan's Invention Labs, based in Chennai, designed Avaz to be not only cheap but also capable of supporting multiple languages. "The average young person in India speaks and uses three different languages every day," Narayanan points out. By working directly with Asian hardware manufacturers, he has been able to bring the cost of an Avaz down to around $800, compared with $5,000 to $10,000 for a single-language device in the United States.
