= Avaz (app) =

Augmentative and alternative communication app

Avaz ('voice' in Persian) is an augmentative and alternative communication (AAC) app, notable for being India's first successful AAC intervention. It is an electronic version of picture exchange cards, used primarily for children with autism spectrum disorders, cerebral palsy, Angelman syndrome, Down syndrome, aphasia, and other non-verbal disabilities. Avaz was invented by Ajit Narayanan, an invention for which he was on MIT's TR35 list for 2011.

== See also ==
- Nonverbal autism
- Picture communication symbols
- Spoken
- Speech generating device
