= Switch access =

Computer device for disabled persons

Switch access is the use of one or more switches to operate computers and other devices and is primarily used by people with severe physical or cognitive impairment. A switch is an assistive technology device that replaces the need to use a computer keyboard or a mouse. It may allow users to control a computer, power wheelchair, video game console, tablet, smartphone, toy, and a variety of other electronic devices.

== Types of switch ==
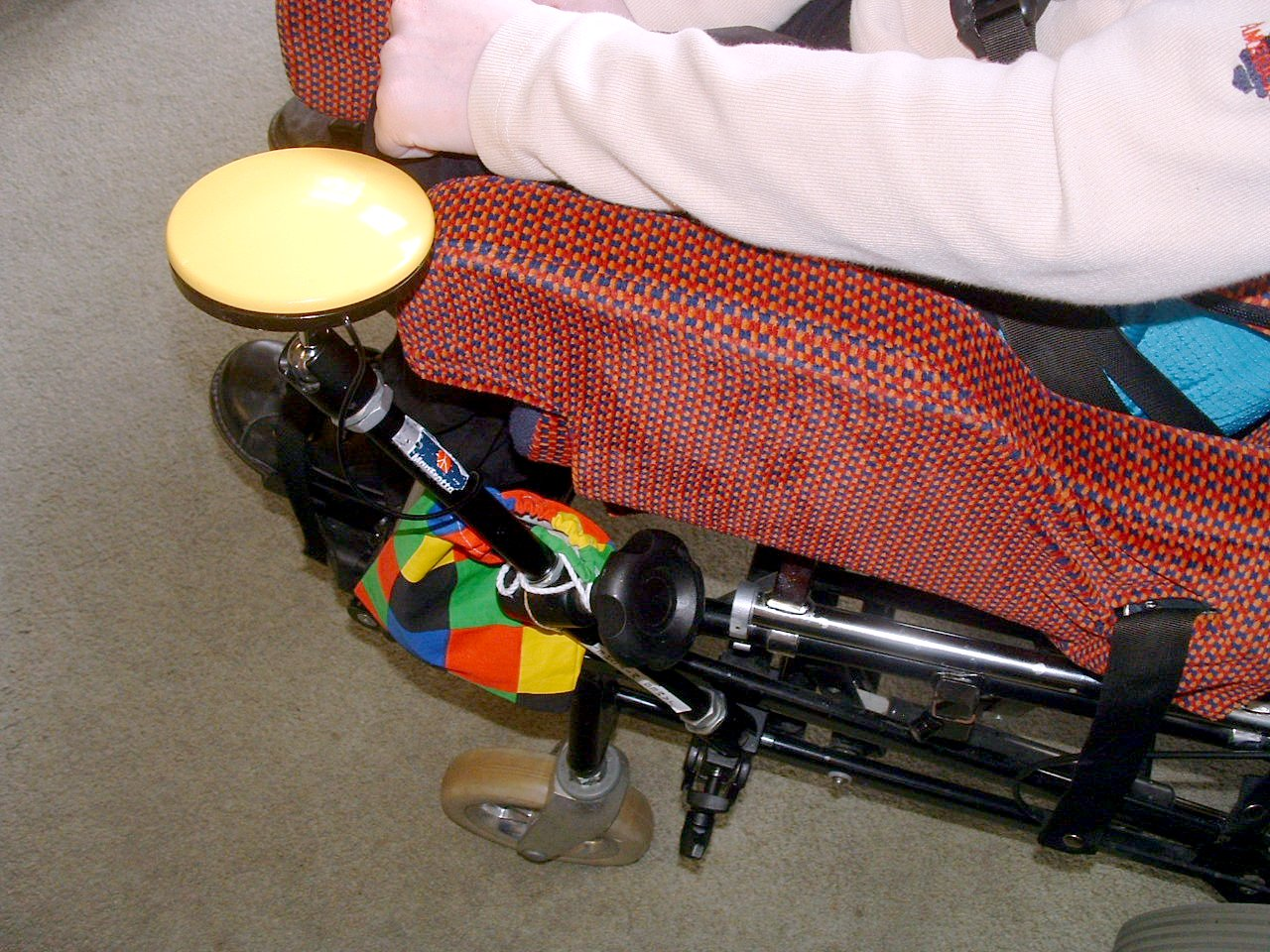
An example of a single switch

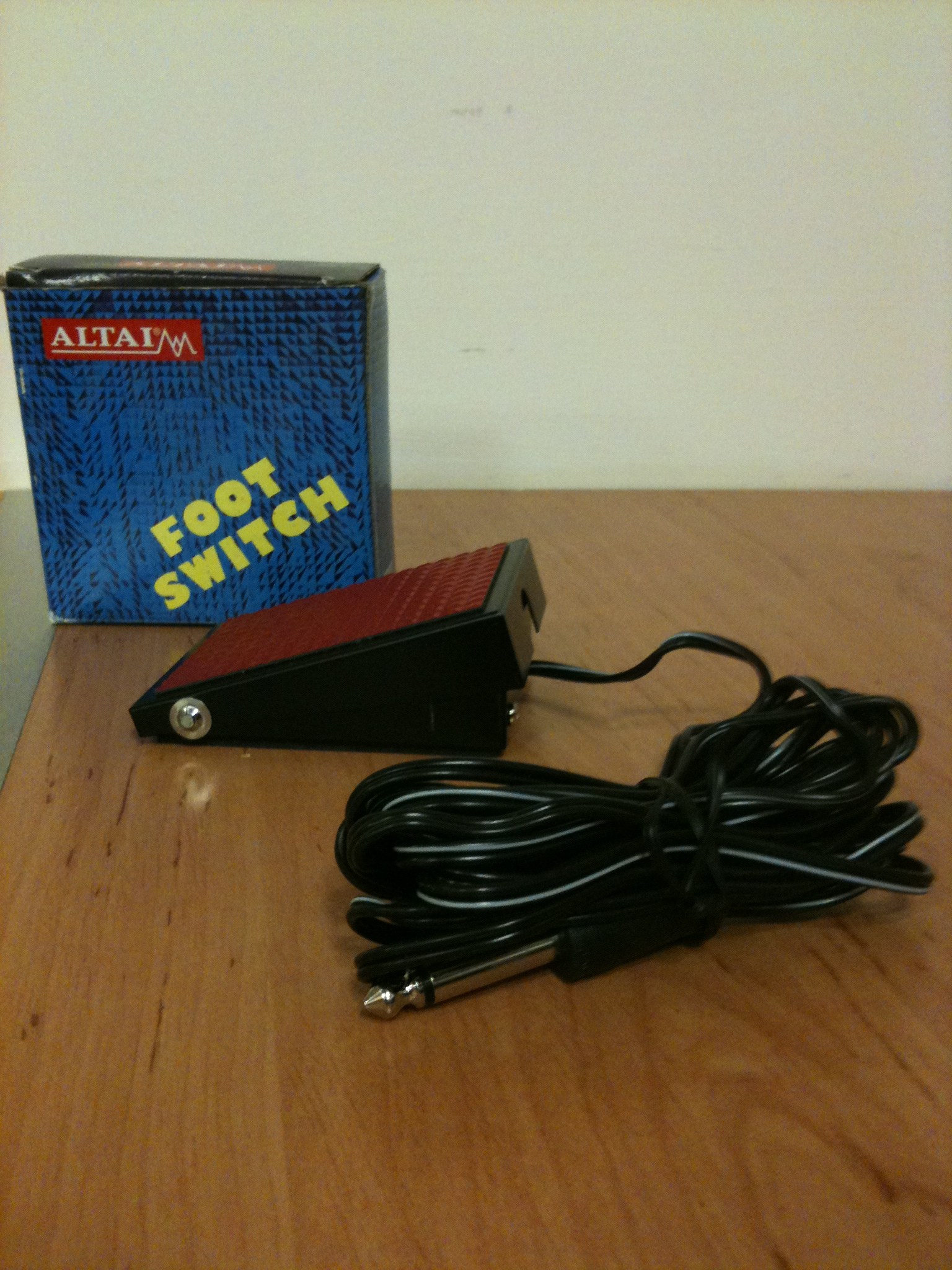
A foot switch

Switches come in a variety of shapes and sizes depending on the action used to activate them (such as sip-puff, pushing, pulling, pressing, blinking or squeezing). Switches also vary in their colour and aesthetics. For push or press switches, the amount of force required to operate them varies or in some cases can be adjusted. Some switches may only require a touch (not even a press), some may be designed to be kicked. A switch can be operated by almost any body part that is able to produce consistent and voluntary movement.

== Connecting a switch ==
A switch cannot be plugged directly into a computer. Instead, a Switch Interface is required to bridge the gap between the switch and the computer's USB, serial, or PS/2 port.

== What can be accomplished with a switch ==
Switches can be suitable for people with cognitive difficulties, developmental delays and physical limitations. In the simplest use they are a clear and simple way to demonstrate action/reaction often referred to as cause and effect. In the more complex use, they could be the means to control mobility or interact with the environment. There are a variety of motivating switch activities that can be used to assess and develop a person's understanding of choice and timing.

Switches can be linked to a variety of devices, for example: Augmentative and Alternative Communication devices, switch adapted toys, switch interfaces for computer access, iDevices, SMART Technology, sensory room equipment and environmental control devices.

== Switch types ==
The smallest amount of interaction that can be provided with a switch is binary switch input, as holding down the switch for a certain amount of time may be impossible for a sip and puff device or painful for someone with arthritis. Some users will prefer to use one switch, others will prefer to use two and sometimes more. For users who are using their switches to access simple activities an additional switch brings about an option of choice. It also allows two users to work collaboratively or to play against each other.

Considering multiple switch access is important for users accessing more advanced activities through switch access scanning. This is usually determined by their physical capabilities. A single switch requires less physical control and is usually less tiring to access but it reduces scanning options and usually leads to a slower rate of input. Single-switch scanning also requires much greater concentration. Two-switch scanning enables a range of scanning options, including row-and-column and overscan. These can greatly increase input rates and can make using a computer or electronic assistive device far more comfortable and efficient.
