= David Eastham =

Canadian author and poet

David William Eastham (1963–1988) was a Canadian autistic author and poet. Despite being nonverbal for his entire life, he began learning to type in 1979 using a communication aid and facilitation, reportedly making him the first person with autism to do so. His mother, Margaret Eastham, also played a major role in teaching him to communicate, including through the use of Montessori methods and other techniques, some of which were similar to facilitated communication. His 1985 book, Understand: Fifty Memowriter Poems, has been identified as the first autobiography written by someone who identified as autistic. He died in 1988 of drowning, at the age of 24. In 1990, his mother published Silent Words, in which she described the techniques she used to teach her son to type, speak, and use sign language.
