= Crowdsourced Testing (company) =

Crowdsourcing platform

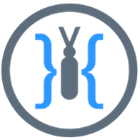
- Native name: Crowdsourced Testing SpA
- Industry: Software Testing, Crowdsourcing
- Founded: Montreal, 2012
- Founder: Simon Papineau
- Headquarters: Montreal, Canada and Santiago, Chile
- Services: Crowdsourcing

Crowdsourced Testing is a crowdsourcing platform which provides functional, localization, usability and Beta testing through crowdsourcing.

== History ==
- Crowdsourced Testing was launched in 2012 by QA on Request, a traditional quality assurance testing company.
- They were invited to join Start-Up Chile's fifth cohort in November 2012, and were selected out of 100 as one of the 21 startups to pitch for the Demo Day. It was then that Simon Papineau, Crowdsourced Testing's founder and current CEO began to split his time between Canada and Chile, as a Chilean team began to grow.
- In April 2013, Crowdsourced Testing was invited, along with six other companies, to join the Wayra acceleration program.
- They were invited to join Rackspace's 24k Startup Program in July 2013, and Tech Wildcatters' Globe Start in August 2013.

== Testing process ==
After every project, a tester's performance is rated on a scale of 0–10. This score is averaged with his previous scores in order to get his Tester Score. Only testers with scores above 6 are allowed to participate in paid projects. First-time testers who register to the Crowdsourced Testing platform are required to begin with free (non-paid) projects before getting their Tester Score above 6.

When requesting a testing project, clients are able to choose between the devices they want tested, the time spent on each device, and the number of testers to test. Crowdsourced Testing also offers packs for people who do not know what tests their product requires.

== Products ==
In addition to its testing services, Crowdsourced Testing has launched two products designed to help testers during the testing process.

=== Damn Bugs ===
Damn Bugs was launched in March 2013 as a free, web-based bug tracking software. It is only a bug-tracker, and does not claim to act as a test management software. Its features are:

https://bugtrack.in/

- Free Chrome browser extension that allows testers to take screenshots and report bugs without having to leave the page that they are on
- Permission management for each testing session
- Standardized bug reports
- Project status reporting charts
- Email notifications for comments and updates related to your tasks
- Unlimited number of users allowed

Damn Bugs also has a feedback page where users can offer suggestions or voice their concerns. Comments are classified as: "Under Review", "Planned", "Started", "Completed" or "Declined". So far, Damn Bugs developers claim to have implemented more than 75 suggestions into Damn Bugs.

=== Overlook ===
Launched in May 2015, Overlook is a free web-based test plan management software. Its aim is to help teams create executable test plans for test-plan driven testing. Its features include creating and executing test plans, and iOS and Android readiness checklists. Like with its other product Damn Bugs, Crowdsourced Testing has launched a forum to collect user suggestions and requests. The team has claimed that they will go through all requests, and implement those that make sense.
