= Nonverbal autism =

Autism spectrum disorder where one cannot speak

Nonverbal autism, also called nonspeaking autism, is a subset of autism spectrum disorder (ASD) where the person either does not learn how to speak, or has a delay or difficulty with speech.

== Background ==
Researchers use several terms, including nonspeaking, minimally verbal, and minimally speaking to describe autistic people who use little or no spoken language. There is no universally accepted definition of nonverbal autism, and studies have used different criteria, ranging from the absence of functional speech to the use of fewer than 20 or 30 functional words. This variation has contributed to difficulties in comparing prevalence estimates and research findings across studies.

Research has examined the relationship between early language development and later developmental outcomes in autistic children. The acquisition of functional spoken language during early childhood is generally associated with more favorable developmental outcomes, although spoken language may also emerge later. A review identified 167 autistic individuals who reportedly acquired speech at age five or older, with most cases occurring between ages five and seven. Estimates of the proportion of autistic children who remain minimally verbal vary depending on the definitions and assessment methods used. Reviews have commonly estimated that approximately 25% to 30% of autistic children develop little or no functional spoken language, while individual studies have reported estimates ranging from approximately 25% to 35%.

The biological basis of autism is not fully understood. Characteristics associated with autism, including differences in social communication, language development, and restricted or repetitive behaviors and interests, often become apparent between the ages of two and three. Many autistic children are diagnosed during early childhood as a result. Various co-occurring conditions, including epilepsy, attention deficit hyperactivity disorder, gastrointestinal problems, sleep disorders, hypermobility, depression, and anxiety, are also reported among autistic people.

== Early predictors ==
The factors associated with nonspeaking autism are not fully understood. Research has identified associations between joint attention abilities and verbal communication in autistic children. Joint attention refers to the shared focus of two individuals on an object or event, often achieved through behaviors such as pointing, eye gaze, or gestures. The development of joint attention during early childhood is associated with later language skills, and studies have reported differences in joint attention behaviors among autistic children compared with non-autistic children.

Research indicates that autistic children may experience differences in both initiating and responding to joint attention. Some studies have found that responding to joint attention may change with development, while individual differences in joint attention abilities have been associated with cognitive and developmental factors. A systematic review and meta-regression found an association between joint attention abilities and language skills in both autistic and typically developing participants, although the strength of this association varied depending on the type of joint attention measured and across different studies. Other research has suggested that early joint attention abilities may be associated with later gains in expressive language among autistic individuals.

Some studies have also examined the relationship between sensory processing patterns and communication development in nonspeaking autistic children. One study suggested that patterns such as reduced responsiveness to some stimuli (hyporesponsiveness) and increased interest in certain sensory experiences (sensory seeking) may be more common among nonspeaking autistic children and may be associated with differences in communication development.

Research has also identified differences in nonverbal communication during early childhood. In comparisons of autistic children aged two to three years with children who had other developmental delays and typically developing children, autistic children showed greater differences in measures such as joint attention, eye contact, pointing, and gesture use. These differences in early nonverbal communication have been studied as potential characteristics that may help differentiate autism from other developmental conditions.

== Assessment ==
Assessing language, cognition, and communication in minimally verbal autistic people can be difficult, because many standardized assessments require spoken instructions or spoken responses. Recommended assessment practices include using multiple measures, allowing additional time, reducing unnecessary verbal demands, and accepting alternative response methods. Eye tracking and neurophysiological measures have also been investigated because they can assess some abilities without requiring an overt spoken or motor response.

== Potential causes ==
There is a growing body of tentative evidence indicating the amygdala's involvement in the development of autism. The amygdala theory of autism focuses on the importance of the amygdala in relation to social functioning and observes that autism is largely a severe impairment of social functioning. The amygdala is thought to be associated with the fight-or-flight response in animals and its activity is heavily correlated with fear in humans. Additionally, it has been heavily implicated in relation to social functioning in various animal studies. Evidence suggests an amygdala hyperactivity model may be more accurate than one comparing it to a lesion.

Lesion studies have shown that amygdala damage results in severe social impairment among animal models. Vervet monkey mothers with amygdala lesions were shown to be much less caring with their young, neglecting and even abusing them. Rats with amygdala ablations become much more docile. Monkeys with lesions to the anterior temporal lobe develop a disorder known as Klüver–Bucy syndrome, characterized by loss of fear, hypersexuality, hyperorality, and an inability to recognize visual objects (often, but not always).

Evidence shows the amygdala accounts for the emotional, oral, and sexual abnormalities listed above. These abnormalities coincide with several characteristics of the diagnostic guidelines for autism, at least passably for an animal model.

Post-mortem analysis of humans shows an increased neuronal density in the amygdala in autism compared to controls, indicating a potential linkage and supporting the hyperactivity model.

Several studies presented subjects with ASD photographs of human eyes and had them report the emotional state of the person in the picture. A smaller amygdala was associated with increased response time but not decreased accuracy. There was also significantly less amygdaloid activation in the brains of those with ASD than controls. Subjects compensated for this lack of amygdaloid activity with increased activation in the temporal lobe, and are associated with verbally labeling images. This activity is thought to imply less usage of emotional/social cues to identify objects and rather more objective, factually based processing. One may extrapolate from this model that patients with autism may learn that a specific facial configuration represents an emotional state and what that emotional state implies socially, but they may not come to truly understand how that person feels. This supports a theory of mind deficit.

The left amygdala is critical in the involvement of processing mental state and emotional information from complex visual stimuli, particularly the eye region. However, individuals with autism do not seem to engage the amygdala during tasks when processing the emotions of others. Instead, they exhibit greater reliance on temporal lobe structures, specialized for verbally labeling complex visual stimuli and processing faces and eyes. This shift in processing may serve as compensation for potential amygdala abnormalities in individuals with autism.

Studies conducted specifically on nonspeaking autistic individual provide similar evidence. Brain studies have shown several amygdaloid impairments among those with ASD. The amygdala in those with nonspeaking autism have less volume compared to controls, contain a higher density of neurons suggesting hyperconnection, and show a negative correlation between amygdala size and impairment severity among subjects.

While infantile autism is actually associated with an oversized amygdala, there are developmental theories as to how this may occur. Research on major depressive disorder has shown that excessive activation such as stress or fear leads to allostasis, or degeneration of the neurons involved in creating the phenomenon. Initial hypertrophy results in atrophy and reduction of brain size in the given region. Over time, this occurs in patients with severe depression, and they develop a decreased amygdala size. Some scientists theorize that this is happening early during infancy in the autistic brain, accounting for the initial overgrowth and later observed size reduction.

When eye tracking software is employed to record where subjects focus their visual attention on images of human faces, small amygdala volume is associated with decreased eye fixation. Eyes are considered to be especially important for establishing human connection and conveying emotion, thus fixation on them is considered to be a crucial part of identifying people and emotions in a social setting.

In addition to a negative correlation to eye fixation studies showed a smaller amygdala was associated with impairment in nonverbal communication skills as well. This suggests that the amygdala is critical in developing all types of communicative abilities, not just verbal. This suggests the amygdala may play a crucial role in relating to other humans in a way that allows for behavioral mimicry.

Among nonspeaking autistic patients, researchers could predict symptom severity based on amygdala activity. Those with the least amygdala activity had the most impaired nonspeaking communication abilities, those with the most activity had the strongest communication abilities.

The development of language, similar to the development of most physical skills, relies heavily on mimicry of other humans. ASDs are known to impair one's ability to focus on and relate with people possibly as a result of a damaged amygdala. Nonspeaking autistics will often be able to learn more basic communicative skills such as pointing to objects or selecting a picture from a list. These skills are far more simple and do not require the degree of personal connection needed for language development.

Neuroimaging research has also investigated structural differences in language-related brain pathways among individuals with nonverbal autism. A 2025 diffusion tensor imaging and myelin water imaging study reported alterations in white matter organization within language pathways, suggesting that differences in brain connectivity may contribute to persistent language difficulties. The authors noted that the findings demonstrate associations rather than establishing causation.

== Language outcomes ==
When considering language abilities in autism, two main theories come into play: the theory of mind and the procedural deficit hypothesis (PDH). Both theories share a common approach, aiming to understand the connections between language and non-language domains and explore whether similar behavioral profiles can be elucidated by common neurocognitive substrates. The theory of mind in autism provides an explanation for pragmatic impairments in language and communication, attributing them to social deficits and their underlying neurocognitive mechanisms. In contrast, the PDH suggests that grammatical impairments, encompassing syntax, morphology, and phonology, in individuals with autism can be predominantly attributed to abnormalities in the procedural memory system. Meanwhile, lexical knowledge, which relies on the declarative memory system, remains relatively unaffected.

Studies of cognitive functioning have found substantial variability among autistic children rather than a single pattern of strengths and weaknesses. Kuschner, Bennetto, and Yost (2007) reported that young autistic children demonstrated diverse profiles of nonverbal cognitive abilities, with some performing relatively well on visual-spatial tasks while others showed different patterns of performance. These findings suggest that nonverbal cognitive functioning in autism is heterogeneous and cannot be adequately described by a single cognitive profile.

Minimally verbal autistic people are a heterogeneous population whose spoken language, receptive language, nonverbal cognition, motor abilities, and social-communication skills may differ considerably. Limited speech alone therefore does not establish a person's level of understanding or overall cognitive ability, and conclusions should be based on assessments that minimize spoken and motor response demands.

Augmentative and alternative communication (AAC) includes communication methods that supplement or replace spoken language. Unaided AAC includes gestures and manual signs, while aided AAC includes picture systems, communication boards, speech-generating devices, and applications installed on tablets or mobile devices. AAC may serve as a persons' primary communication method or may be used alongside developing speech. Continued interventions can be used to teach them more advanced operations on these devices (i.e. turning on the device, scrolling through pages, or adding additional vocabulary), helping them enhance their communicative abilities independently.

The use of AAC does not appear to prevent the development of spoken language. Systematic reviews have generally found that speech production either remained stable or improved following AAC intervention, although spoken-language gains were often modest and did not replace the need for AAC.

Research examining clinical implementation of augmentative and alternative communication (AAC) has identified barriers to its use. A 2025 survey of speech-language pathologists in India found that clinicians generally viewed AAC as beneficial for individuals with nonspeaking autism but reported challenges including limited professional training, financial constraints, reduced access to resources, and inconsistent family support.

Nonspeaking autistic adolescents and adults may transition away from dedicated speech-generating devices, instead opting to use apps on their personal mobile devices, like Spoken or Avaz.

The Picture Exchange Communication System (PECS) is a form of spontaneous communication for children with autism in which an individual selects a picture indicating a request. PECS can be utilized in educational settings and at the child's home. Evidence concerning PECS is mixed. A Cochrane review found that children receiving PECS used more PECS symbols and initiated communication more frequently immediately following intervention, but the identified gains were not maintained at a ten-month follow-up. The review rated the overall quality of the evidence as very low because only one PECS trial met its inclusion criteria and the study had methodological limitations.

It has been suggested that a significant stage in acquiring verbal language is learning how to identify and reproduce syllables of words. One study found that nonspeaking and minimally speaking autistic children are capable of enhancing their oral production and vocalizing written words by isolating each syllable of a word one at a time. The process of breaking down a syllable at a time and having it visually displayed and audibly available to the child can prompt them to imitate and create nonrandom and meaningful utterances.

Research on autistic adults suggests that integration of verbal and nonverbal emotional information differs from that of neurotypical adults. One experimental study found that adults with high-functioning autism relied more heavily on spoken language than facial expressions or vocal emotional cues when interpreting emotional messages. Because the study included verbally fluent adults, its findings may not generalize to nonverbal autistic individuals.

Research on interventions for minimally verbal autistic people remains limited by inconsistent definitions, small samples, short follow-up periods, and an emphasis on requesting rather than broader communication functions. A 2025 systematic review of speech-generating-device interventions for autistic preschoolers found most studies targeted requesting, while fewer examined communication functions such as commenting or social interaction. Reviews have also called for more research involving adolescents and adults and for outcomes that reflect communication across everyday settings.

== See also ==
- Augmentative and alternative communication – Techniques used for those with communication impairments
- Late talker – Toddler with delayed language development
