= Quick, Draw! =

2016 browser game by Google LLC

- Publisher: Google LLC
- Designers: Jonas Jongejan, Henry Rowley, Takashi Kawashima, Jongmin Kim, Ruben Thomson, Nick Fox-Gieg
- Platform: Browser
- Release: November 14, 2016
- Genre: Guessing game

Quick, Draw! is an online guessing game developed by the Google Creative Lab and Data Arts Team and published by Google LLC that challenges players to draw a picture of an object or concept, then uses a neural network-based artificial intelligence (AI) to guess what the drawings represent. The AI uses an open-source dataset of all previous drawings to "learn" and improve its ability to guess correctly in future matches. The game is similar to Pictionary in the sense that the player has a limited amount of time to draw (20 seconds). The concepts that it guesses can be simple, like "circle", or more complicated, like "kangaroo".

== Gameplay ==
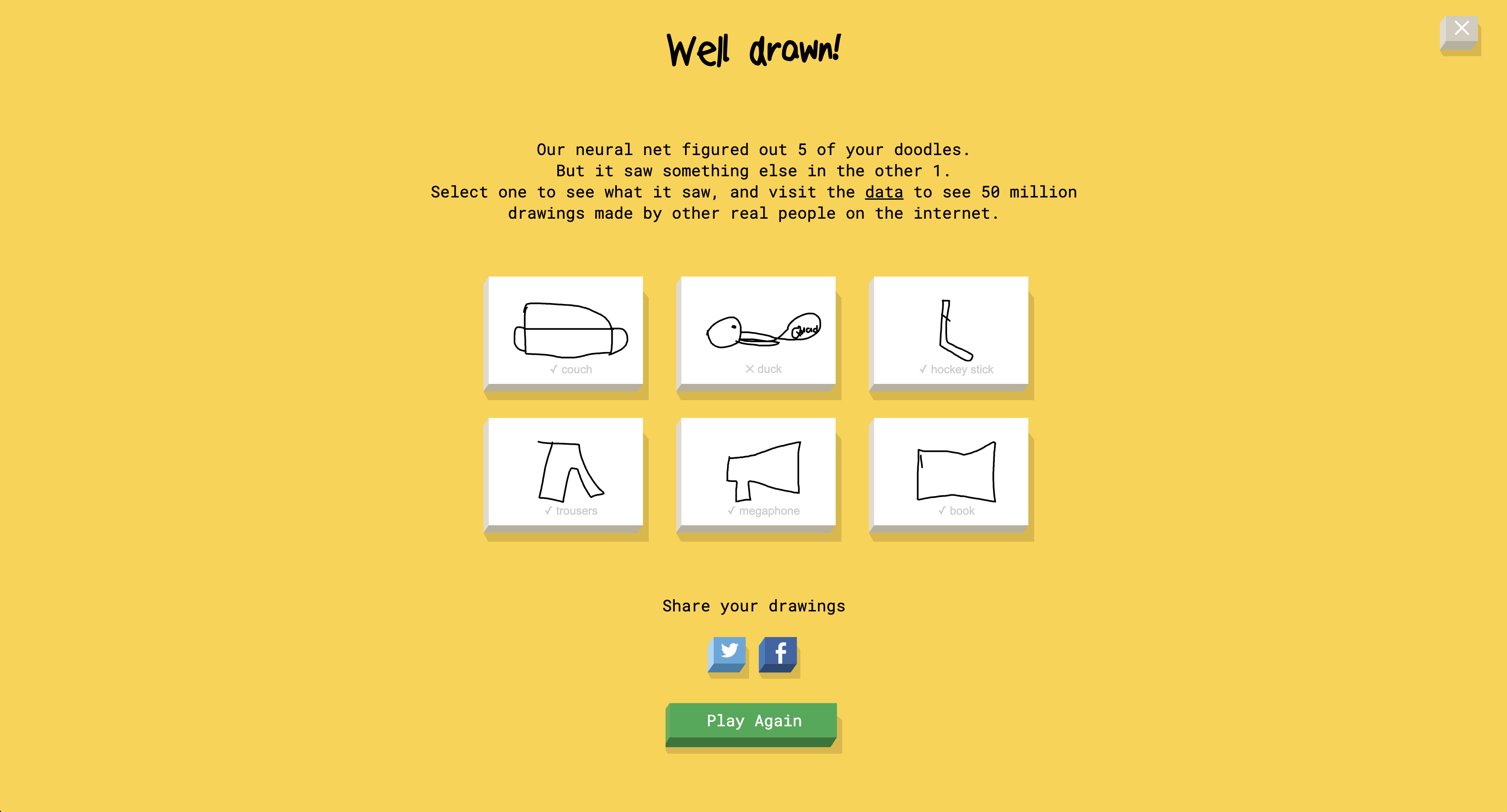
The results of a completed Quick, Draw! game on Sunday April 19, 2026.

In a match of Quick, Draw!, there are a total of six rounds. During each round, the player is given 20 seconds to draw a random prompt selected from the game's database whilst the AI attempts to guess the drawing. A round ends either when the AI successfully guesses the drawing or time runs out.

At the end of a Quick, Draw! match, the player is given their drawings and results for each round. When clicking on a drawing, the player can view the AI's comparisons of their drawing with other player-given drawings. From there, the player can share their drawings to Facebook or X, replay the game, or quit.

== Dataset ==
The dataset of 50 million player drawings is openly available on the Quick, Draw! website. The site provides a step-by-step process of how the images are used by the AI and stored on the Quick, Draw! servers. The code collects the prompt given to the player, the drawing, whether the AI correctly guessed the drawing correct, and the country the player lives in. This two-letter country code is the only piece of personal data the game saves from its players. The dataset stores the drawings of players through the Ramer–Douglas–Peucker algorithm, which simplifies the curves of the drawing so that the dataset stores less data points. The site also links the legal license that allows them to share, store and adapt data from the game.

== Artificial Intelligence Training ==
The Creative Team at Google used self-supervised representation learning to train the AI for Quick, Draw! For this, the team fed their machine a set of pre-labeled drawings, giving the AI a basis on which it can guess that drawing in the future. In Quick, Draw!, the self-supervision comes from the dataset of previous drawings. This means that all the developers need to do to continue training the AI is keep the site active and let people play the game.

== Data applications ==
- The Quick, Draw! dataset was used to train part of the app Spoken, which features a canvas that can recognize drawings and convert them to synthesized speech as a communication aid.
- The technology used to recognize the doodles in Quick, Draw! is also used to recognize characters and languages by Google Translate.

== See also ==
- Google Labs
