= Spoken (app) =

Assistive technology app

Spoken - Tap to Talk AAC

- Spoken's word prediction UI and voice selection as seen on tablet and smartphone
- Other names: Spoken, Spoken AAC
- Original author: Michael Bond
- Developers: Spoken, Inc.
- Release: 2019; 7 years ago
- Stable release: 1.9.7 / November 2026; 0 months ago
- Operating system: iOS, Android, MacOS
- Available in: English
- Type: Augmentative and alternative communication application software
- License: Proprietary
- Website: spokenaac.com

Spoken (also known as Spoken - Tap to Talk AAC and Spoken AAC) is a mobile application and augmentative and alternative communication (AAC) tool launched in 2019. The app was designed to aid individuals with speech and language impairments like aphasia or nonverbal autism, using a combination of symbols, text, and voice output.

== History ==
Michael Bond began development of Spoken in 2015, prompted by a need for modern and accessible tools in speech therapy, as traditional methods had not significantly changed in the last 50 years. The project saw considerable advancement due to participation in the Start-Up Chile accelerator program, where it took first place against eighteen competing startups on the 13th generation's Demo Day in November 2015. The app officially launched in 2019.

Many of Spoken's original symbols were borrowed from The Noun Project, selected using crowdsourced human-based computation to determine the best icons for individual words. Although many Noun Project icons are still used in Spoken, an effort has been made to switch to proprietary icons for improved style consistency and faster word recognition.

The real-world application of Spoken's technology was unexpectedly extended during the COVID-19 pandemic, assisting patients recovering from ventilator use. By March 2021, the application had garnered over 10,000 downloads and reported a sustained 20% monthly growth. By May 2022, it was averaging an additional 1,000 downloads per week.

In February 2022, Spoken joined AlphaLab Health, a startup accelerator by Allegheny Health Network and Innovation Works. This provided the company with access to clinical resources, funding, and mentorship, further enabling its growth. It has also participated in other programs like the Multiple Autism Accelerator and Slalom Ventures' AI for Good Accelerator.

In September 2025, the app introduced compatibility with ElevenLabs, giving users the tools to create voice clones and prompt-generated voices within the app.

Spoken has set out to expand its technological offerings to more languages, seeking to address the needs of underserved populations and preparing for growing global demand.

== Operation ==
Spoken distinguishes itself from other AAC applications through the use of a large language model that provides predictive text capabilities, similar to a smartphone's autocomplete function. This feature learns from the user's speech patterns, offering increasingly personalized suggestions over time. Users can expand the app’s vocabulary in three ways: by repeatedly using new words in sentences so Spoken learns their context, by adding terms in bulk through the "Add Vocabulary" option for basic prediction, or by using the "Personalized Predictions" feature, which asks targeted questions to ensure new words are immediately predicted in the correct contexts. Additionally, Spoken can tailor its predictions based on the user's location, providing contextually relevant suggestions in specific settings such as restaurants or hospitals.

The application includes a selection of natural-sounding, synthesized voices with customization options for pitch, speed, and volume, enabling users to choose a voice that best represents their identity or preferences. All voices included in Spoken are named after plants rather than people to make them appear more gender-neutral or unisex. Examples include Elderberry, Bottlebrush, and Dandelion. In 2025, Spoken expanded to allow users to access voices from external sources like Acapela. The same update added tools to generate new voices via ElevenLabs, either using text descriptions or voice cloning.

Spoken supports a variety of input methods to accommodate different user needs and preferences. Beyond conventional typing and predictive text, it recognizes handwriting and even simple drawings, translating these inputs into spoken words. The data used to train Spoken's drawing canvas was sourced from the game Quick, Draw!, allowing it to recognize very crude drawings with great accuracy. The app also accepts emojis as an input, using them as a visual search to return related words.

Spoken also offers a saved phrases feature, designed for users who regularly use specific sentences or expressions. These phrases can be retrieved in just two taps, streamlining communication in fast-paced or emergency situations.

Another feature of Spoken is its "attention button." This feature was designed as a substitution for verbal cues like clearing one's throat. A single tap of this button repeatedly blinks the device's flashlight and plays a customizable, attention-grabbing sound. AAC users can use this feature to notify others that they are about to speak, or to quickly get someone's attention in an emergency.

For additional accessibility, Spoken incorporates features like large print, dark mode, and word dividers to ensure that the app is usable and comfortable for individuals with varying needs. Updates have focused on improved compatibility with eye tracking and screen readers.

Users can also display their sentences in fullscreen scale for communicating in high volume environments or in situations where they don't want to make noise.

Other features include the ability to quickly share written content or audio clips from the app via text or email and an option to block certain words from appearing in predictions, providing an extra layer of personalization.

== See also ==
- Speech-generating device
- Avaz
