= Mark Dahmke =

- Born: 1956 (age 69–70); Nebraska, United States
- Occupations: Software developer, it consultant, author
- Years active: 1979–present
- Notable work: Development of voice synthesizer for William Louis Rush

Mark Dahmke is an American software developer, IT consultant, and author. He was a consulting editor for BYTE magazine during the late 1970s and early 1980s and authored several books on operating systems and microcomputers.

== Biography ==
Dahmke was born in Columbus, Nebraska, in 1956. His family moved to Osceola, Nebraska and in 1971 to David City, Nebraska where he attended high school, graduating in 1975.

He pursued higher education at the University of Nebraska–Lincoln, where he worked as a programmer for the University of Nebraska Computing Network's Academic Computing Services from 1978 to 1980.

He competed in multiple science fairs, earning numerous awards for his work in prosthetic limb design. At the Greater Nebraska Science Fair, he finished first in Engineering with his project on bionics in prosthetic limbs. He was awarded the David Hawksworth Memorial Scholarship to the University of Nebraska–Lincoln College of Engineering. He also received certificates of merit from the U.S. Air Force and Navy, along with a certificate of merit and a bronze medal from the U.S. Army.

Dahmke's project, "Limb Prosthetics: A New Design," gained further recognition at the 26th Annual International Science and Engineering Fair (ISEF) in Oklahoma City, where he competed against 386 projects from all 50 states and four foreign countries. His work earned him a first-place engineering award from the fair and a first runner-up award from the U.S. Air Force.

== Career ==
=== Early career ===
In 1979, while still a student, he founded MCD Consulting, offering software development and IT consulting services. He initially experimented with the Intel 8008 chip and later constructed an Intel 8080-based system with expandable memory and peripherals including cassette tape storage, a TV display, floppy disk drives, and a telephone modem.

In 1979, Dahmke partnered with William Louis Rush, the first quadriplegic student to attend Nebraska, to develop a voice synthesizer that allowed Rush to communicate by typing words phonetically, which were then vocalized. The device provided Rush with a functional "voice" and significantly improved his ability to interact with others. Dahmke developed software for a vocal communication aid program using the Computalker CT-1 analog speech synthesizer with a microcomputer. The software used phonemes to generate speech, assisting individuals with communication impairments in constructing words and sentences. One of his most notable contributions was the "Vocabulary Management System" for Rush, which contributed to the advancement of augmentative and alternative communication (AAC) technologies.

=== Writing and editorial work ===
Dahmke began contributing articles to Byte magazine in 1977, focusing on topics such as star mapping, multiprocessing, and multitasking. His work led to a position as a Consulting Editor at Byte starting in 1980. Dahmke wrote extensively on microcomputer operating systems, speech synthesis, and emerging computer technologies.

He authored Microcomputer Operating Systems (1982), which was translated into multiple languages.

He also wrote The Byte Guide to CPM/86 (1982), a technical manual on the CP/M-86 operating system. Throughout the early 1980s, Dahmke reviewed pioneering computers such as the Osborne 1 and Compaq's first IBM-compatible PC, providing insights that were recognized by industry founders.

=== Star Mapping ===
Dahmke is noted for his work in three-dimensional stellar visualization, particularly in generating star maps and constellation views from locations beyond the solar system. Throughout 1976, Dahmke developed software for IBM mainframes and early microcomputers, while simultaneously honing his writing skills. In late 1978, during discussions with Ray Coté, managing editor of Byte magazine, Dahmke learned of an upcoming issue focused on scientific applications. He submitted an article A Simulated View of the Galaxy describing his star map program, which was subsequently published in the April 1979 issue of Byte. The article documents one of the first known attempts to generate and animate a three-dimensional visualization of stars within the Milky Way using computer graphics, making Dahmke a pioneer in digital stellar simulation.

Although the formal publication of his star mapping work occurred in 1979, Dahmke had developed the underlying animation software as early as 1975–1976. This timeline positions him among the earliest contributors to computer-generated stellar visualization. Alvy Ray Smith, co-founder of Pixar, confirms that Dahmke's work predated other notable projects, such as Smith and Jim Blinn’s galaxy animation for Carl Sagan’s Cosmos series (1979–1980) and Loren Carpenter’s star position computations for Star Trek II: The Wrath of Khan (1981–1982).

=== Later career ===
From 1995 to 2015, Dahmke served as vice president and co-owner of Information Analytics, Inc., a full-service IT company. After selling the business in 2015, he continued as a consultant during the transition period. In 2014, he established Dahmke.com, LLC.

Post-Information Analytics, Dahmke returned to freelance work and also pursued photography professionally. In 2016, he became a certified commercial drone pilot, focusing on aerial photography and video, particularly related to Nebraska landscapes and tourism.

=== Television adaptation ===
In 1980, Dahmke's work on assistive technology was highlighted in Life magazine's January issue in an article titled "The Expanding World of Bill Rush," written by editor Anne Fadiman. The article detailed Dahmke's development of a voice synthesizer to aid Rush's communication and its impact on Rush's life as a journalism student at Nebraska. The article received the United Cerebral Palsy President's Award, which was presented to Fadiman in Kansas City for its insightful portrayal of disability and innovation.

Following the publication of the Life article, Dahmke and Rush sold the movie rights to the Konigsberg Company, a California-based production house. In August 1980, CBS announced plans for a television movie inspired by Dahmke's work in developing assistive technology and his collaboration with Rush. The film, produced by Frank Konigsberg, was scripted by Nick Arnold, a writer with cerebral palsy, to ensure an authentic and sensitive depiction of the subject matter. The project was envisioned as a fictionalized portrayal of Dahmke's technological contributions and their impact on Rush's life, rearranging events for dramatic effect. Both Dahmke and Rush retained creative input, with plans to contribute additional material during the summer of 1980. However, despite the initial announcements, the filming never commenced.

== Selected publications ==
Dahmke has authored several books, including:

- "Microcomputer Operating Systems" (1982)
- "The BYTE Guide to CP/M-86" (1984)
- "Using Concurrent PC DOS" (1986)
- Chapter 12: Database Integration of "Website Administrator’s Survival Guide" (1996)
- "The Prairie Astronomy Club: Fifty Years of Amateur Astronomy" (2010)
