= William Louis Rush =

American disability rights advocate

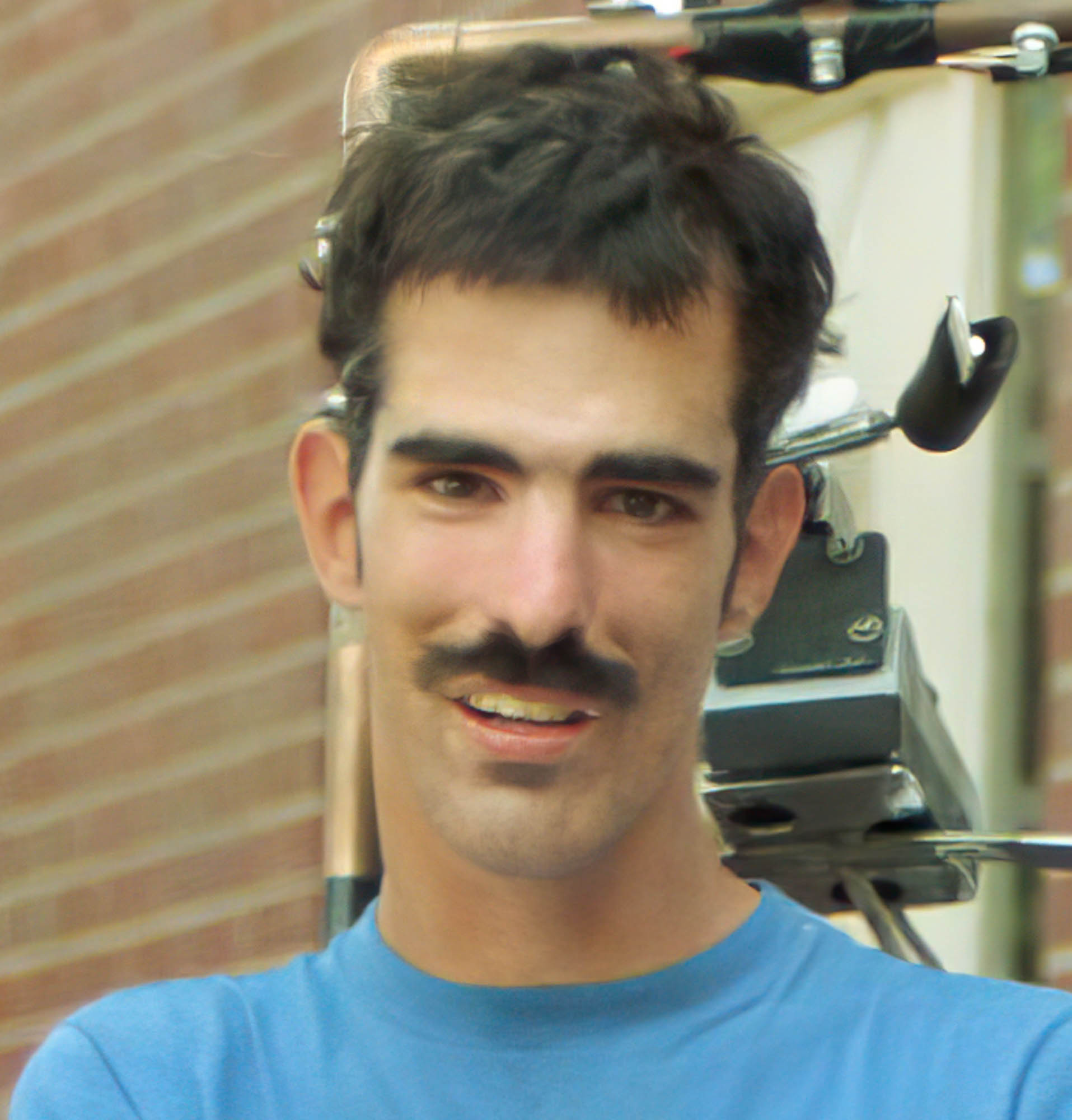
- Rush in 1990
- Born: August 20, 1955; Omaha, Nebraska, US
- Died: December 13, 2004 (aged 49); Lincoln, Nebraska, U.S.
- Resting place: Forest Lawn Memorial Park, Omaha, Nebraska
- Education: University of Nebraska–Lincoln
- Occupations: Author, journalist, and disability rights advocate

William Louis Rush (August 20, 1955 – December 13, 2004), commonly known as Bill Rush, was an American author, journalist, and disability rights advocate. In addition to his autobiographical book, Journey Out of Silence, also posthumously co-wrote Our Life Our Way, A Memoir of Active Faith, Profound Love, and Courageous Disability Rights with his wife, Christine F. Robinson. Rush's work mainly focused on promoting the rights and representation of individuals with disabilities. Rush was unable to walk, talk, or sit in his wheelchair without supportive braces and restraining straps.

== Early life and education ==
Rush was born in 1955 in Omaha, Nebraska, to Lois and James Rush. Complications during his birth, including a displaced umbilical cord that restricted oxygen flow to his brain for nearly an hour, resulted in cerebral palsy. The condition, caused by damage to the cerebral cortex that controls voluntary movements, affected his speech and mobility but was neither fatal nor progressive. He attended J.P. Lord School, excelling academically despite significant physical challenges.

In the late 1970s, Rush became the first quadriplegic student to attend the University of Nebraska–Lincoln. While on campus, he partnered with Mark Dahmke, a software developer who helped develop a voice synthesizer. The device allowed Rush to communicate by typing words phonetically, which were then vocalized, providing him with a functional "voice". In addition to the synthesizer, Rush used a headstick—a long stick attached to a headband—and a language board to communicate. He also utilized a Selectric typewriter for completing homework and writing articles. His room was equipped with environmental controls, enabling him to operate various electrical devices remotely.

Rush graduated with honors in 1983 from the College of Journalism and Mass Communications, becoming a symbol of resilience and advocacy for accessibility in higher education.

== Career ==
He contributed articles, op-eds, and letters to publications such as the Omaha World-Herald and the Lincoln Journal Star. In these writings, he highlighted barriers faced by people with disabilities, advocating for accessible schools, public transportation, and public spaces in Nebraska.

In 1986, Rush published Journey Out of Silence, a memoir chronicling his life, education, and advocacy efforts. Written painstakingly using a stick attached to his forehead, the book resonated widely, gaining attention for its candid portrayal of living with a disability in the pre-Americans with Disabilities Act (ADA) era.

Rush served on the Nebraska Governor's Council on Developmental Disabilities and the board of Nebraska Advocacy Services. He also contributed to public information campaigns, including the creation of brochures aimed at promoting dignity and understanding in media representation of individuals with disabilities. Rush testified before Congress in support of the ADA and lobbied for legislation allowing people with disabilities to marry without losing Medicaid benefits. He also authored a manual for newsrooms, encouraging respectful and accurate reporting on disability issues. Through his writings, activism, and public speaking, he helped shape policies, including the Americans with Disabilities Act (ADA). His writings include Journey Out of Silence and articles like "Bus Not Meeting Everyone's Needs" and "Failure to Pass Americans with Disabilities Act Too Costly".

In 1980, Bill Rush was prominently featured in Life magazine's January issue in an article titled "The Expanding World of Bill Rush," written by editor Anne Fadiman.

== Personal life ==
In 1988, Rush met Christine Robinson, a Canadian occupational therapist, at a conference on alternative communication methods. Their relationship grew into a partnership that culminated in their marriage in 1999. Rush campaigned successfully for policy changes allowing him to marry without losing critical Medicaid benefits, setting a precedent for others in similar situations.

== Death ==
Rush died at his home in Lincoln, Nebraska, on December 13, 2004, at the age of 49, from pneumonia and complications related to severe neck injuries originally sustained when he was struck by a car in 1998.

== Television adaptation ==
Following the publication of the Life article, Bill Rush and Mark Dahmke sold the movie rights to the Konigsberg Company, a California-based production house. In August 1980, CBS announced plans for a television movie inspired by Rush's life and his partnership with Dahmke, stating the film was expected to be ready for television by the next season. The movie, produced by Frank Konigsberg, was scripted by Nick Arnold, a writer with cerebral palsy, to ensure an authentic and sensitive depiction of the subject matter.

== Bibliography ==
=== Publications ===
- Rush, Bill. "ADAPT." Nebraska Rehabilitation and Community Newsletter, Vocational Rehabilitation, Nebraska Department of Education, September 1995.
- Rush, Bill. "A Perfect 'Roll' Model." Nebraska Rehabilitation and Community Newsletter, Vocational Rehabilitation, Nebraska Department of Education, December 1994.
- Rush, Bill. "A Personal Spiritual Journey Testimony." First Baptist Church Tower, Vol. 3, Issue 26, 1996.
- Rush, Bill. "Belonging and Compliments: Both are Necessary." Nebraska Rehabilitation and Community Newsletter, Vocational Rehabilitation, Nebraska Department of Education, October 1995.
- Rush, Bill. "First Baptist Lincoln Gets a Very Special Thank You!" The Messenger – American Baptist Churches of Nebraska, Summer 1991, p. 7.
- Rush, Bill. "The Perfect Memory." Prentke Romich Inc. Current Expressions Newsletter, Summer 1992.
- Rush, Bill. "On the Road – Finally." Nebraska Rehabilitation and Community Newsletter, Vocational Rehabilitation, Nebraska Department of Education, July/August 1996.
- Rush, Bill. "ADAPT – Empowerment NOT Terrorism." Nebraska Rehabilitation and Community Newsletter, Vocational Rehabilitation, Nebraska Department of Education, December 1994.
- Rush, William. "A Model to the Community." Christian Single, November 1992, pp. 32–33.
- Rush, William. "Adding Insult to Injury." RN, September 1991, pp. 21–25.
- Rush, William. "Dalton's Legacy." In Beneath the Surface: Creative Expressions of Augmented Communicators, edited by Sarah Blackstone, International Society of Augmentative and Alternative Communication, ISAAC Series: Vol. 2, 2000.
- Rush, William. "Harvesters with Disabilities: A Journey Testimony." Journal of Religion, Disability & Health, Vol. 7, Issue 4, 2003.
- Rush, William. "Invisible Healing: The Personal Testimony of a Quadriplegic." Presbyterian Survey, March 1994, pp. 18–20.
- Rush, William. "It's Time to Deliver on Promises to Americans with Disabilities." Lincoln Journal Star, Lincoln, Nebraska, April 27, 1996.
- Rush, William. Journey Out of Silence. 1st Edition, Media Publications & Marketing, 1986, ISBN 0-939644-21-5
- Rush, William. "Liberating Myself." In Speaking Up and Spelling It Out, edited by Melanie Fried-Oken and Hank Bersani, Jr., pp. 148–152. Baltimore: Brookes, 2000.
- Rush, William. "My Turn to Speak." Communication Outlook, Vol. 13, No. 3, 1992, p. 19.
- Rush, William. "The Making of a Square Hole." On the Level: Newsletter of the League of Human Dignity, Lincoln, Nebraska, November/December 1999.
- Rush, William. "Write with Dignity." Gilbert M. and Martha H. Hitchcock Center Publication, School of Journalism, University of Nebraska–Lincoln, 1983.

=== Unfinished ===
- Rush, William L. (29 October 2019). Our Life Our Way: A Memoir of Active Faith, Profound Love and Courageous Disability Rights. Christian Faith Publishing, Inc. ISBN 978-1-64515-927-8.

=== Selected articles ===
- "Bus Not Meeting Everyone's Needs"
- "Failure to Pass Americans with Disabilities Act Too Costly"
- "Getting to Cabaret Not Easy"
- "Selleck Quads Not So Different from Most Students"
