= Switch access scanning =

Switch access scanning is an indirect selection technique (or access method), used with switch access by an assistive technology user, including those who use augmentative and alternative communication (AAC), to choose items from the selection set. Unlike direct selection (e.g., typing on a keyboard, touching a screen), a scanner can only make selections when the scanning indicator (or cursor) of the electronic device is on the desired choice. The scanning indicator moves through items by highlighting each item on the screen (i.e., visual scanning), or by announcing each item via voice output (i.e., auditory scanning), and then the user activates a switch to select the item. The speed and pattern of scanning, as well as the way items are selected, are individualized to the physical, visual and cognitive capabilities of the user. While there may be different reasons for using scanning, the most common is a physical disability resulting in reduced motor control for direct selection. Communication during scanning is slower and less efficient than direct selection and scanning requires more cognitive skill (e.g., attention). Scanning using technology has an advantage allows the user to be independent in controlling the assistive technology for those with only one voluntary movement.

== Scanning patterns ==
Linear scanning example

Row/Column scanning example

A scanning pattern refers to the way items in the selection set are presented to the user. It allows for easier item selection as the scanning is systematic and predictable. Three primary scanning patterns exist:

- In circular scanning, individual items are arranged in a circle (like the numbers on a clock face) and the scanning indicator moves in a circle to scan one item at a time. Although circular scanning is visually demanding, it is the simplest scanning pattern as it is cognitively easy to master.
- In linear scanning, items are usually arranged in a grid and the scanning indicator moves through each item in each row systematically. Although linear scanning is cognitively more demanding than circular scanning, it is relatively straightforward and easy to learn. However, it may be inefficient if there are many items in the set (e.g., in a grid consisting of 8 items per row, if the desired item were the 7th item in the 4th row, the scanning indicator would have to scan through 30 undesired items first before reaching the desired item.
- In group-item scanning, items are grouped (e.g., by row, column, or other meaningful categories) and the scanning indicator will first scan by groups. Once the scanner selects the group his desired item belongs to, the scanning indicator will scan each item in the selected group. Among the variations of group-item scanning, the most common is row-column scanning where the items are grouped in rows.

== Scanning control techniques ==
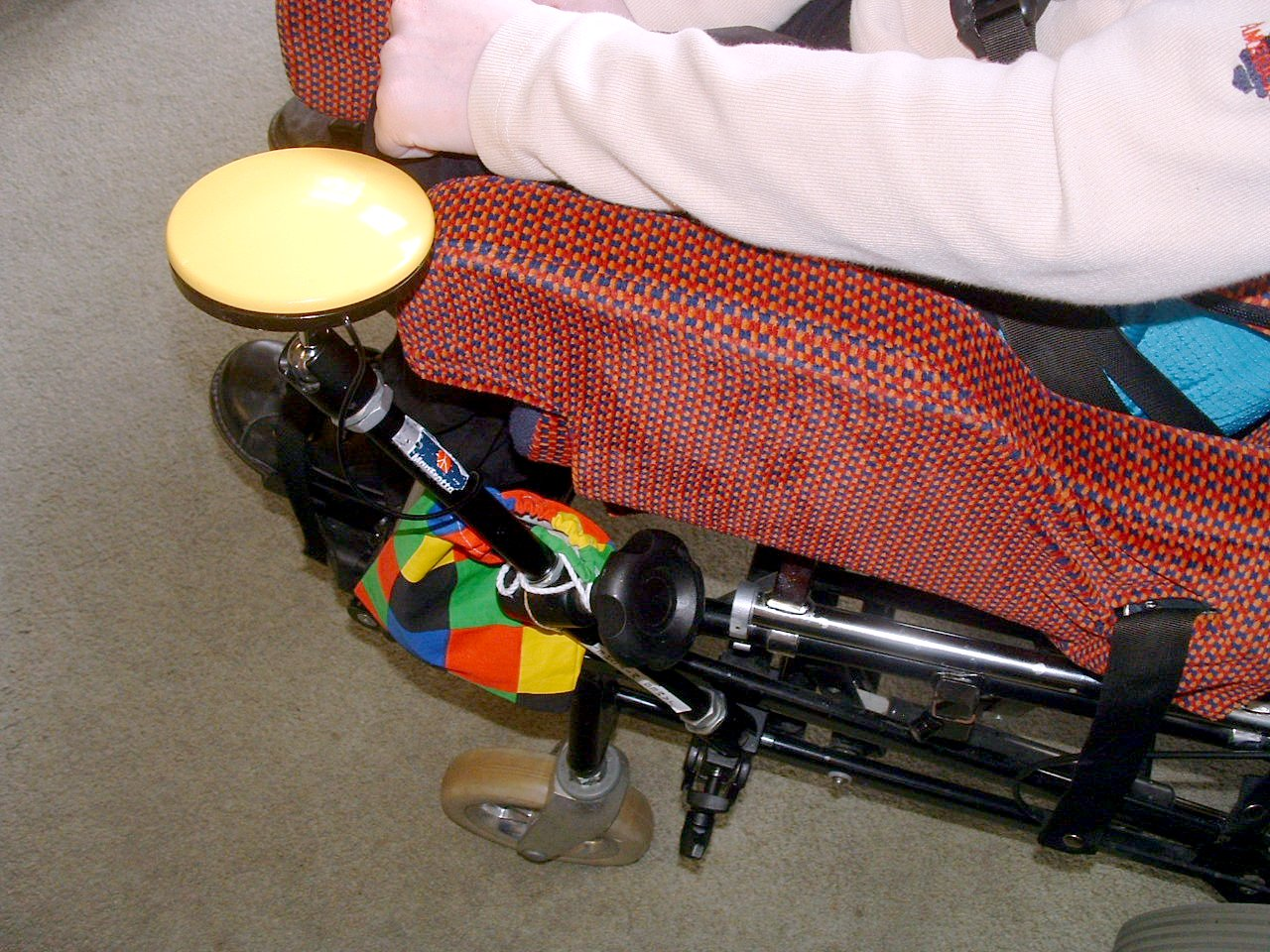
A wrist switch

Scanning control and item selection occurs through switch activation in three general ways:

- In directed (or inverse) scanning, the indicator will only scan in the preset pattern when the user holds down a switch. Selections are made when the switch is released.
- In automatic (regular or interrupted) scanning, the indicator scans in the preset pattern on its own and item selection occurs when the scanner hits a switch.
- In step scanning, the user controls each movement (or step) of the scanning indicator through its preset pattern by hitting a switch. To select an item, the AAC user hits a second switch once the indicator reaches his desired item. Because of the constant switch activation, this method might be too fatiguing for the certain scanners, including those with Amyotrophic lateral sclerosis, but is easier cognitively.
