= Switch adapted toys =

Switch adapted toys are toys or devices which have been adapted so that their original switches are redirected to a larger external switch that is easier for the user to interact with. Many children and adults with limited fine and gross motor skills cannot play with regular battery-operated toys. For children or young people who have profound and extremely limiting physical and intellectual disabilities, operating a switch adapted toy may be the first independent thing they can do, which builds confidence and enjoyment as well as intellectual stimulation and potential learning.

== Accessible Switch Features ==
Depending on the user's abilities, different switches are available for different purposes, including: finger switches, foot switches and button switches of many different sizes and varieties. Some switches have special textural coverings - soft fabric, "squishy" latex, pom pom, or "bump" patterned for the visually impaired. Use of switches depends on the user's muscle tone, spasticity, visual ability, cognitive function and interests. Switch adapted toys can generate blinking or changing lights and music, speaking, vibration, noises, fans, aromatherapy, massage, songs with number, alphabet or nursery rhyme content and even voice recording and playback.

== Switch adapted toys in The United States ==
Nearly all switch adapted toys and devices are items that can be purchased from the store and are adapted after-market by individuals and organizations. Some individuals sells these switch adapted items on online through retailers like Etsy, Amazon, and Shopify. Some larger companies also sell these items as well as proprietary devices intended for therapy.

== Switch adapted toys in Australia ==
A number of suppliers exist in Australia but they use imported switch adapted toys which means the toys are expensive to buy. Toy libraries in Australia sometimes offer switch adapted toys.

Toy libraries may import switch adapted toys or have volunteer helpers who are able to take an existing battery operated toy and convert it to switch adapted. Toys which have only one function are ide for adaptation but more complex, multi-function toys may not be so easy. Adapting a battery toy at home can be achieved with the use of a small number of tools.

A crowd funding page Toys for Tots through The Cerebral Palsy Alliance exists to generate funds needed to create a supply of switch adapted toys for use in a number of designated local libraries, starting a programme offering the toys to eligible children in locations closer to their homes.

== How to switch adapt a toy ==
There are many resources to aid in adapting a toy to be switch operated. A guide to switch adapting was created by Greg Nakata, AIA entitled "Let's Adapt for Everyone!". This adapting guide shows all the tools and supplies one would need to start adapting toys and devices as well as detailed tutorials for specific types of toys to adapt. Nakata also posts adapting tutorial videos on his Instagram profile: AdaptedDesign where his goal is to make adapting accessible to everyone by sharing his knowledge and demystifying the process.

There are also online guides that demonstrate how to adapt toys for switch activation, such as TheLaserguy2's "Santa's Switch Adapted Toys" series.
