= Start-Up Chile =

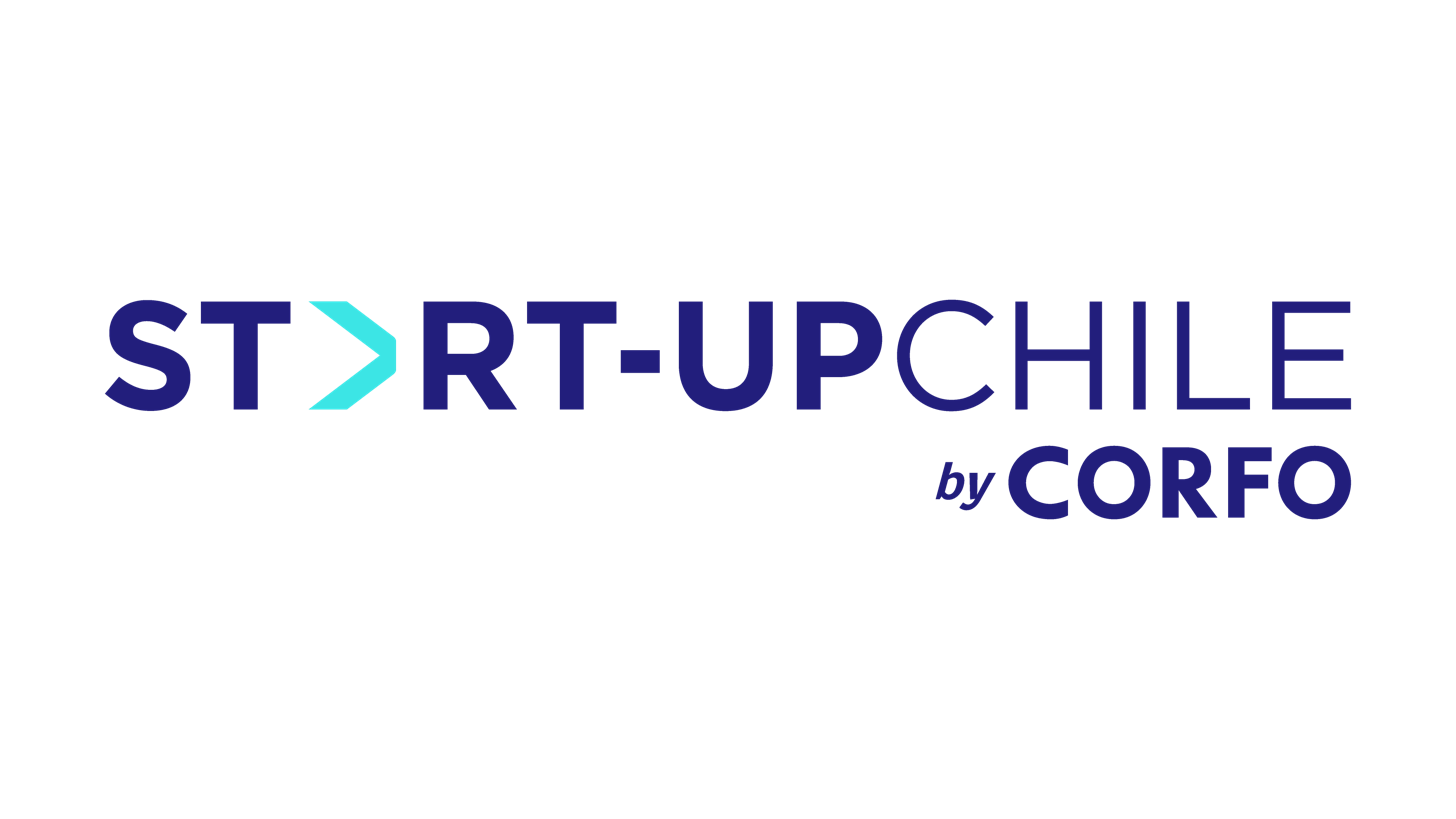
- Industry: Seed acceleration
- Founded: 2010
- Headquarters: Santiago, Chile

Start-Up Chile (also known by its acronym, SUP) is a seed accelerator created by the Chilean government, based in Santiago de Chile. It was founded in 2010 with the goal of increasing the number of national and international ventures that are generated in the country.

This entity provides equity-free investment to tech based startups from around the world. To date, the accelerator has supported projects from 85 countries including Chile, the United States, India and Brazil, among others.

== Objective ==
The scheme's stated objective is to turn Chile into the innovation and entrepreneurship hub of Latin America by attracting the world's best and brightest entrepreneurs to bootstrap their startups in Chile.

== The program ==
The program is managed by CORFO, the Chilean Economic Development Agency, with the mission of encouraging entrepreneurship and innovation to improve productivity in Chile.

Start-Up Chile launched in 2010 and nowadays provides funding to tech based startups form all over the world based on the development status of their businesses.

The project is divided into three main programs:

- Build → $15M Program focused on early stage startups, seeking to leave with a minimum viable product (MVP)
- Ignite → $25M Focused on startups that are looking for their product-market fit
- Growth → $75M Focused on established startups that are in the scaling stage

As a transversal initiative, the accelerator aims to reduce the gap that exists in the entrepreneurship and innovation ecosystem through various community activities, visibility and quotas in each generation.

== Alumni companies ==
- Admetricks, acquired by Similarweb
- Babytuto, acquired by Walmart
- Autofact, acquired by Australiana Car Group
- Cabify, a ridesharing company that operates in Spain and Latin America.
- Méliuz, a Brazilian coupon app.
- Betterfly
- NotCo, a Chilean food-tech company that creates plant-based alternatives to animal-based products.
- Spoken, an American software company that develops an augmentative and alternative communication app. Winner of Start-Up Chile's 13th annual Demo Day.

== See also ==
- CORFO
