= DynaVox =

Speech generating device company

Tobii Dynavox
- Formerly: DynaVox Systems Inc. Sentient Systems Technology Inc.
- Type: Limited liability company
- Industry: Hardware and software development
- Genre: Application Software
- Founded: 1983; 43 years ago
- Founders: Gary Kiliany, Mark Friedman, Tilden Bennett
- Headquarters: Sweden, Danderyd, Sweden
- Number of locations: 10
- Area served: Worldwide
- Products: AAC devices and software
- Brands: Tobii Dynavox, Boardmaker
- Divisions: Tobii Dynavox; Boardmaker
- Website: www.tobiidynavox.com

Tobii Dynavox is a Swedish-based developer, manufacturer, and distributor of speech generating devices headquartered in Danderyd, Sweden, with offices in Pittsburgh, Norway, Germany, France, the UK, China, Japan, South Korea, and Taiwan. The company was formed in 1983 and produces speech communication devices and special education software used to assist individuals in overcoming speech, language and learning challenges.

== History ==
Founded as Sentient Systems Technology, Inc. in 1983, the company's first product was the EyeTyper. Created as a student project at Carnegie Mellon University to help a young woman with cerebral palsy to communicate, the EyeTyper allowed individuals spell messages with their eyes. These messages were then "spoken" by a computerized voice.

The EyeTyper made it possible for some people with cerebral palsy to communicate effectively. Killiany formed the company with CMU professor Mark Friedman and business partner Tilden Bennett. The patent for this technology was sold to the US Navy and all revenue went back into further development of communication applications that could be used by more people with significant speech disabilities. In 1991 the first DynaVox branded product was released. The DynaVox was the first speech-generating device to feature touchscreen technology.

The company changed its name to DynaVox Systems Inc. when was acquired by Sunrise Medical Inc. in 1998., before being spun out again several years later. In 2004 DynaVox acquired Enkidu Research Inc. and Mayer-Johnson. In 2009 DynaVox Mayer-Johnson acquired BlinkTwice, and incorporated that company's product, the Tango AAC device, into the DynaVox product line. DynaVox acquired Eye Response Technologies in January 2010.

The company floated on the stock market in 2010, although as of September 2011, its stock had fallen by 29.8% year in the last year In 2012, after continued falling stock prices, Dynavox was warned by Nasdaq that if shares continued to be valued below $1 the company would be dropped from the exchange. "The company intends to consider available options to resolve the noncompliance with the minimum bid price requirement," DynaVox said in a recent SEC filing. "No determination regarding the Company's response has been made at this time." In a separate and unrelated matter, DynaVox said in a separate SEC filing that JoAnn A. Reed would not seek re-election to the company's Board of Directors when her term expires on December. 5, 2012. On April 10, 2013, Dynavox announced that it received notification on April 5, 2013, that The NASDAQ Stock Market LLC ("NASDAQ") had determined to delist the company's Class A common stock from the NASDAQ Global Select Market, effective with the open of business on April 16, 2013. As previously disclosed, on October 2, 2012, the company received a notice from NASDAQ indicating it was not in compliance with NASDAQ's $1.00 minimum bid price requirement. The delisting is the result of the company's failure to regain compliance with this requirement. The Company did not appeal the NASDAQ staff's determination. The company has been advised by OTC Markets Group Inc. that its Class A common stock will be immediately eligible for trading on the OTCQB marketplace effective with the open of business on April 16, 2013. The company's Class A common stock continued to trade under the symbol DVOX.

In April 2014, DynaVox filed for Chapter 11 bankruptcy protection. On May 22, 2014, it was announced that competitor Tobii acquired DynaVox, and integrated them into Tobii's integrated Assisted Technology division. The company was renamed Tobii Dynavox LLC. The US division remains in Pittsburgh.

In 2022, Sogou partnered with Tobii Dynavox to integrate eye-tracking technology into its input method, allowing users with disabilities in China to control computers using eye movement.

Since 2022, Tobii Dynavox has acquired several former reselling partners, including Safe Care Technologies, ASK, Link Assistive, Cenomy, and RehaMedia.

== Product scope ==
DynaVox devices assist individuals who are unable to communicate reliably with their own voices due to cognitive, language and physical impairments. According to the 2005 US disability census, cognitive illnesses alone affect over 16 million people over the age of 15, while 35 million American's were described as having a severe disability.

The devices produced by DynaVox closely resemble touch screen tablet computers. DynaVox uses a Microsoft Windows-based configuration as a platform to run proprietary InterAACt communication software.

DynaVox devices, like almost all Speech generating device, use a hierarchical set of pages that contain different vocabulary for different contexts or situations. DynaVox's particular system of organising these pages is called 'InterAACT'.

== Speech generating devices ==
Dynavox produce a range of speech generating devices, including the very small 'Xpress', and the 'Tango', which was designed particularly for children. Its newest device is called the Maestro, which, like the older V+ and VMax+ and M^{3}, provides options for multiple communication channels including cell phone, text messaging and e-mail. The larger Vmax is typically selected for those using wheelchairs (the device can be mounted) or for individuals with visual impairments. All Dynavox devices can be accessed in a variety of ways to compensate for limited physical abilities. The M^{3} is physically similar to the V+ and provides a limited number of prerecorded messages, and is often used by individuals with limited or no literacy skills.

=== Access systems ===
DynaVox also produced the EyeMax, which is an accessory which allows someone with limited or no fine motor skills to use their eyes to control their device.
