= Picture communication symbols =

Set of drawings used for augmentative and alternative communication

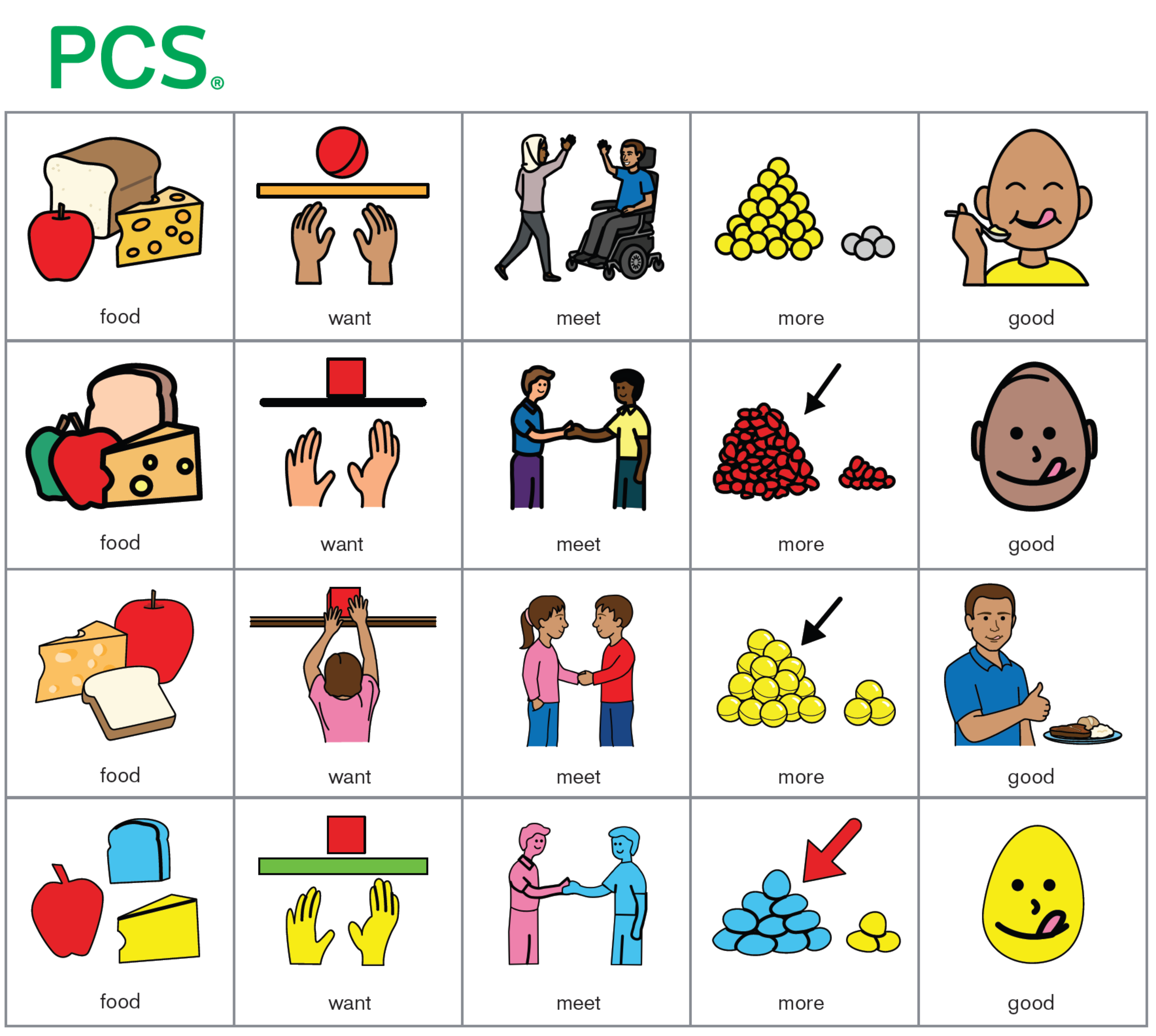
PCS for Non-verbal communication.

Picture communication symbols (PCS) are a set of colour and black & white drawings originally developed by Mayer-Johnson, LLC for use in augmentative and alternative communication (AAC) systems. These AAC systems may be high-tech, such as the TD Pilot, or low-tech, such as a communication board. PCS symbols are now owned and maintained by Tobii Dynavox.

== Symbols ==
Several studies have found PCS to be more transparent than other graphic symbols such as Blissymbols. A graphic symbol is transparent if "the shape, motion, or function of the referent is depicted to such an extent that meaning of the symbol can be readily guessed in the absence of the referent" (Fuller & Lloyd, 1991, p. 217). Because of its high transparency, PCS symbols are easy to learn by children with little or no speech. Several studies have reported that children with cognitive disabilities can learn PCS easily. The communication interventions for individuals who have little or no speech have used PCS successfully for individuals.

The PCS set comprises a core library of roughly 5,000 symbols, supplemented by general-purpose addendum libraries and country-specific libraries for a total of 80,000+ symbols. PCS symbols have been translated to 40 different languages. PCS symbols are also used in the whole language instruction method.

Common uses for the PCS symbol set include speech therapy, picture schedules for people with autism, and helping people facing limitations while hospitalized.

== History ==
In the 1970s, Roxie Johnson, a speech-language pathologist, recognised the need for a set of picture symbols to help people with limited or no speech to use for communication. Johnson wrote the book "The picture communication symbols (PCS)," which included 700 picture symbols. Later in the 1980s, Johnson, together with her husband, Terry Johnson, started the Mayer-Johnson company. (Tobii Dynavox, 2024)

For over 30 years, picture communication symbols (PCS) have been used by millions of children and adults to help understand the world around them, structure their thoughts, and learn both to write and to read.

The initial symbol set released in the 1970s were line drawings representing a wide range of concepts, actions, and objects. It is easily recognizable and visually clear, available in books to be cut out, copied, and used to support communication skills.

Over time, the PCS set expanded significantly by adding thousands of new symbols to cover a broader range of topics and vocabulary. PCS and Boardmaker gained popularity with language pathologists, therapists, special educators, and parents. These actors started using PCS and boardmaker to create personalized communication boards, visual schedules, social stories, token economy systems, and other visual supports to aid individuals with special needs in learning and communication.

As technology advanced, PCS and Boardmaker symbols transitioned from being primarily available in physical and printed form to digital formats. The digital versions allowed customization, easier sharing and integration with other software and devices used in special education and therapy settings. (Tobii Dynavox, 2024) However, Boardmaker has taken a step back in terms of integration. A physical CD is now required to run the Boardmaker program.

PCS offerings continued to expand on Boardmaker as well as other software applications based on user feedback, new research, and changing educational and communication needs. Tobii Dynavox states, "The symbols have been revised and updated over the years to ensure relevance and usability." (Tobii Dynavox.com, n.d) As of April 2024, there are over 79,000 Picture communication symbols available in a variety of languages.

== Boardmaker ==
A drawing program with PCS is called Boardmaker. Boardmaker was created by Mayer-Johnson LLC. The software was initially developed for Apple Macintosh and later to Microsoft Windows. It started around the late 1980s or early 1990s by the Johnson couple.

There were many versions of Boardmaker for Mac & Win, which include:

- Version 1 for Microsoft Windows (1994 - 2001)
- Version 3 for Macintosh (1991 - 2004)
- Version 5 for Microsoft Windows (2001-2007) and Macintosh (2004-2008)
- Version 6 for Microsoft Windows (2007-2020) and Macintosh (2008-2020)
- Version 7 for Windows, Android, iOS (2020-current)

There are many different versions of Boardmaker, such as:

- Boardmaker Plus
- Boardmaker with SD Pro
- Boardmaker Studio
- Boardmaker 7

== See also ==
- Picture Exchange Communication System
