= Picture Exchange Communication System =

Communication teaching method for people with limited speech

Example of basic PECS communication board

The Picture Exchange Communication System (PECS) is an augmentative and alternative communication (AAC) system developed and produced by Pyramid Educational Consultants, Inc. PECS was developed in 1985 at the Delaware Autism Program by Andy Bondy, PhD, and Lori Frost, MS, CCC-SLP. The developers of PECS noticed that traditional communication techniques, including speech imitation, sign language, and picture point systems, relied on the teacher to initiate social interactions and none focused on teaching students to initiate interactions. Based on these observations, Bondy and Frost created a functional means of communication for individuals with a variety of communication challenges. Although PECS was originally developed for autistic children, its use has become much more widespread. Through the years, PECS has been successfully implemented with individuals with varying diagnoses and of varying ages. PECS is an evidence-based practice that has been highly successful with regard to the development of functional communication skills.

== Philosophy ==
The training protocol is based on the principles of applied behavior analysis. The goal of PECS is spontaneous and functional communication. The PECS teaching protocol is based on B. F. Skinner's book, Verbal Behavior, such that functional verbal operants are systematically taught using prompting and reinforcement strategies that will lead to independent communication. Verbal prompts are not used, thus building immediate initiation and avoiding prompt dependency. PECS begins with teaching a student to exchange a picture of a desired item with a communicative partner, who immediately honors the request. After the student learns to spontaneously request a desired item, the system goes on to teach discrimination among symbols and then how to construct a simple sentence. In the most advanced phases, individuals are taught to respond to questions and to comment. Additionally, descriptive language concepts such as size, shape, color, number, etc. are also taught so the student can make their message more specific. For example, I want big yellow ball.

== PECS protocol ==
Reinforcer inventory: Prior to implementing the PECS protocol, the teacher, parent, or caregiver develops an inventory of items such as toys, books, and edibles that the learner enjoys. Preferred items are presented to the learner to determine which one(s) they want. This preference assessment is completed throughout the day in a variety of activities. Once the desired item or activity is determined, the communicative partner will entice the student with the item. This way, no verbal prompting is needed. The chosen items (reinforcers) should be assessed to ensure they are motivating to the user.

The PECS Protocol consist of six phases:

Phase 1 – how to communicate: During phase I, the focus is on teaching the student to initiate social communication by exchanging a picture of a desired item. This exchange is taught presenting one picture, selected by the trainer based on the student's observed preferences. Within Phase 1, two trainers are utilized. One trainer acts as the student's communicative partner, and the other trainer acts as the physical prompter, who prompts the student after he makes an initiation towards the desired item. The student is taught to pick up the picture through the use of hand over hand techniques and reach towards the communicative partner with the picture, in exchange for the requested item.

Phase 2 – distance and persistence: During phase 2, the student is taught to expand the initiated social interaction by creating motivation for the student to seek out the communicative partner even when he or she is not nearby and waiting. The goal of this phase is to have the student generalize his or her requests across places and people and to increase the likelihood of spontaneous communication. The student is taught to communicate over longer distances, whether it be across a table or going to another location to find a communicative partner, and initiate spontaneous communication. Training should progress across different settings, with different communicative partners, and different types of highly motivating and preferred items to assist in the generalization of PECS usage.

Phase 3 – discrimination between symbols: As soon as the student has demonstrated distance and persistence in multiple settings with multiple communicative partners, they are ready to be introduced to phase 3A – visual discrimination. During structured training sessions, the student will begin to work on discriminating between highly preferred and non-preferred items. During other times throughout the day, the learner should continue to generalize phase 2 skills. The next step is to teach discrimination between two items that are both contextually relevant and desirable to the learner. This is done with correspondence checks to ensure that the learner is requesting and taking the item for which he or she is asking. The student is taught discrimination of symbols and how to select the symbol that depicts a desired item. If students have difficulty with discrimination, there are systematic ways of incorporating error correction and alternative strategies.

Phase 4 – using phrases: Within phase 4, the student learns to construct simple sentences on a detachable sentence strip, making requests such as "I want ____ ". The requests consist of a sentence starter, "I want", and a picture of the desired activity or item. The communicative partner reads back the sentence after it has been exchanged by the student. After the student has learned to construct the sentence and point to the pictures, a delay between "I want" and the picture of the desired item is inserted as a way to encourage vocalizations. Speech/vocalizations are celebrated by providing the student with a greater amount of the requested item/activity and additional preferred items as a way to promote speech on future exchanges. Speech/vocalizations are never demanded, just encouraged through the use of the delay. Teaching PECS users to create a sentence using expressions such as "I want ___" is the first step in developing more complex sentence structures. After the student learns the basic sentence structure, descriptors such as color, shape, size, and number are taught so that the learner can make their preferences more specific, such as "I want 3 cars".

Phase 5 – answering a direct question: During phase 5, the student is taught to respond to the question, "What do you want?" The goal of this phase is for the learner to respond "I want ___ " after being asked some form of the "what do you want" question. This phase adds upon the already established skill of building a sentence while still using the desired item to motivate the user to respond. A delayed prompting procedure is used in which the question and gestural prompt are initially presented at the same time and later a delay is established between the question and gestural prompt. Ultimately, the student should answer the question before additional prompts are provided.

Phase 6 – commenting: The student can now make spontaneous requests and respond to questions such as "What do you want?" by building the sentence "I want ___" Within phase 6, the student is taught to respond to commenting questions as well as to spontaneously comment on items, people, or activities present in his or her environment. In this phase, the student is also taught the meaning of sentence starters to differentiate between appropriate responses to the questions "What do you see?", which results in a social outcome and "What do you want?" which results in a tangible outcome The teacher should structure the environment to give the student plenty of opportunities to have a variety of communication opportunities that encompass all of their communication skills.

Depending on the age and cognitive level of the user, the time to master PECS will vary. One study found that it takes an average of 246 trials for users to master all six phases of PECS.

== Effectiveness ==
A 2011 meta-analysis found no statistically significant difference in the efficacy of PECS when comparing autistic and non-autistic study participants and when comparing those taught in single or multiple settings. The meta-analysis also stated it may be necessary to adapt PECS to accommodate learners with visual impairments, fine or gross motor difficulties, or problems discriminating between picture symbols. While the authors stated that the case studies they analyzed generally supported the use of PECS to foster communication, they qualified that more research was necessary to validate its effectiveness beyond its third phase, its effectiveness in promoting speech, its effectiveness when used across different settings, and its effectiveness when administered by non-researchers.

A 2008 meta-analysis of existing research found that PECS was effective in improving the functional communication skills of autistic individuals, but recommended further research be conducted on individuals with other diagnoses.

An initial concern was that PECS might delay or inhibit speech development. However, a 2010 review of several peer-reviewed studies found that "there is no evidence within the reviewed studies to suggest that PECS inhibited speech; to the contrary, if any effect was observed, it was facilitative rather than inhibitory." A systematic review of interventions for autistic children reported that use of PECS resulted in short-term improvement in word acquisition, but the effects were not maintained over time.

A 2012 meta-analysis suggested that PECS may be more effective for children who have difficulty sustaining joint attention. A 2010 meta-analysis found mixed evidence that PECS improves aspects of functional communication related to maintenance and generalization. A 2008 meta-analysis stated, "PECS is probably best used as an initial intervention to teach requesting and the basic elements of what is a communicative exchange." The meta-analysis further concluded that PECS was not well suited for longterm use, "as it does not address question asking and may be better implemented as part of a multimodal system for when picture communications are more socially appropriate."

== See also ==
- Blissymbols
- Picture communication symbols

== Bibliography ==
- Bondy, A.S. 2001. "PECS: Potential benefits and risks." The Behavior Analyst Today 2:127-132.
- Mirenda, P. 2001. "Autism, Augmentative Communication, and Assistive Technology: What Do We Really Know?" Focus on Autism and Other Developmental Disabilities 16(3):141-151.
- Hart, S., and Banda, D.R. 2010. "Picture Exchange Communication System With Individuals With Developmental Disabilities: A Meta-Analysis of Single Subject Studies." Remedial and Special Education. 31(6) 476–488.
- Vicker, B. "What is the "Picture Exchange Communication System" or PECS?" Autism Support Network.
