= Mario Christian Meyer =

Swiss-Brazilian doctor (born 1953)

Mario-Christian Meyer
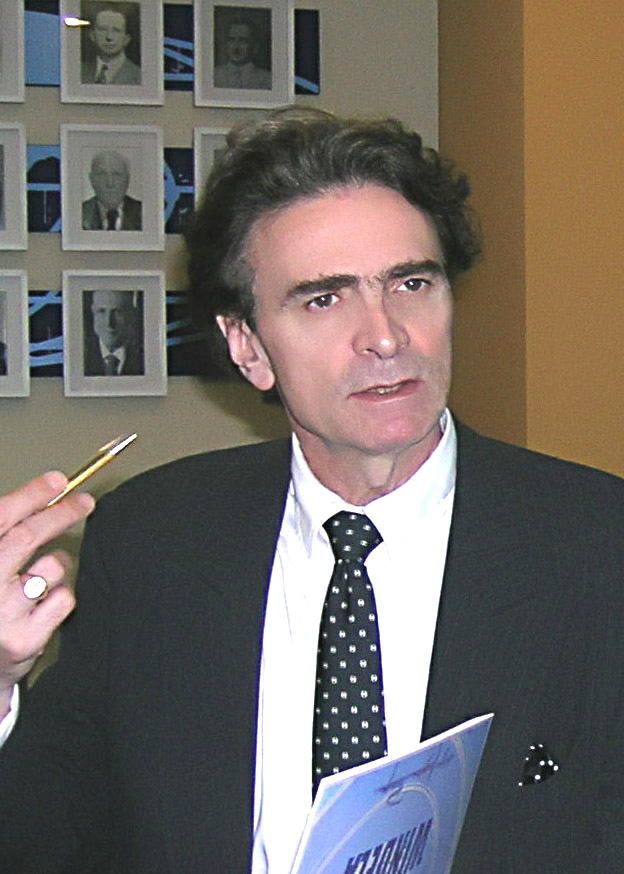
- Born: 4 June 1953; Salta, Argentina
- Known for: Works on "Alliance between modern technology and ancestral knowledge", Valorization of Amazonian biodiversity, Amazonian forest, Amazonian indian
- Awards: Giant of Ecology (2008)
- Scientific career
- Fields: Neuropsychiatry, neuropsychology, neurolinguistics, cross-cultural psychiatry, epistemology, life sciences, biotechnology, medicinal plants, mythology, ecology, Sustainable development
- Institutions: Sorbonne

Mario-Christian Meyer is a Swiss-Brazilian doctor and advocate for the sustainable development of the Amazonia and preservation of its indigenous cultural heritage.

== Early life ==
Meyer was born in Salta, Argentina. His father, Hermann Meyer, a Swiss polytechnics engineer specializing in agronomy, became a fazendeiro (large plantation farmer), first in Argentina, in the early 1930s, then in Brazil in 1954. His mother, Anne Camille Blanc de Corbières Meyer, was a Swiss structural engineer. The young Meyer spent his first months in Salta, where his father had established a Hacienda and an olive oil production plant. Because of Peronism, with its nationalism and isolationism, his family lost everything and, in 1954, consequently moved to Rio de Janeiro, Brazil.

In the book Embracing Amazonia, published in Brazil, 2008, Eliana Spengler (Giant of Ecology Award coordinator) talks about Meyer's childhood and youth:

In his early years, he elected his father's library as his shelter; there he nourished his young mind and imagination reading books by classical Brazilian writers about Amazonian rainforest and Índios. Later, through encyclopaedias, he developed personal approaches to his numerous questions about the meaning of life.

The stories of Brazilian authors Jose de Alencar, Castro Alves and Machado de Assis fueled Meyer's love of the Amazon, while reading Montaigne's" Bon sauvage", Rousseau's "État de Nature" and Locke's concepts of empiricism and "tabula rasa" directed his thoughts on the nature of human development.

Later in life, Meyer experienced an Índios initiation rite, an experience that sealed his commitment to the Amazonian cause.

== Career ==
=== Early career ===
Meyer studied medicine, specializing in Developmental Neuropsychology and Child Psychiatry. He went on to teach at the Sorbonne in Paris. His thesis Apprentissage de la langue maternelle écrite: étude sur des populations autochtones dites socio-culturellement défavorisées dans une approche interdisciplinaire, prefaced by Prof. Dr. Julian de Ajuriaguerra of the Collège de France, published by UNESCO, examined the problems of underprivileged indigenous populations in learning written language.

This work for UNESCO has induced Meyer to study the contribution of western sciences (neuro-psychiatry, neuro-linguistics, neuro-psychology, psycho-motricity, etc.) to the approach of learning disabilities occurring with illiteracy in the developing countries. This official mission led him into the heart of the Amazonian rain-forest for the first time, where he undertook an exhaustive case study about the different forms of graphic representations of the written language used by the Amerindians in their pictographs, ideograms, petroglyphs and body paintings (e.g. Genipapo – Genipa americana, Urucu – Bixa orellana), obtained using plant pigments, where he discovered the power of their active ingredients. Meyer evolved from this work to a general effort to promote the value of indigenous ancestral knowledge and to preserve their natural environment (the Amazon).

Focusing then on the cross-cultural psychiatry's field, he developed through the 1980s his researches for a better understanding of the interactions between Culture and Psyche.

In 1989, Meyer was made a Fellow of the Paris Society of Medicine (in French Société de Médecine de Paris), founded on the "2 Germinal year IV" (French Revolutionary calendar, i.e. 22 March 1796), originating from the Société Royale de Médecine founded in 1730. There, he presented his works on Amazonia, which were to give birth to new medicines.

=== Ancestral knowledge and New pharmacology ===
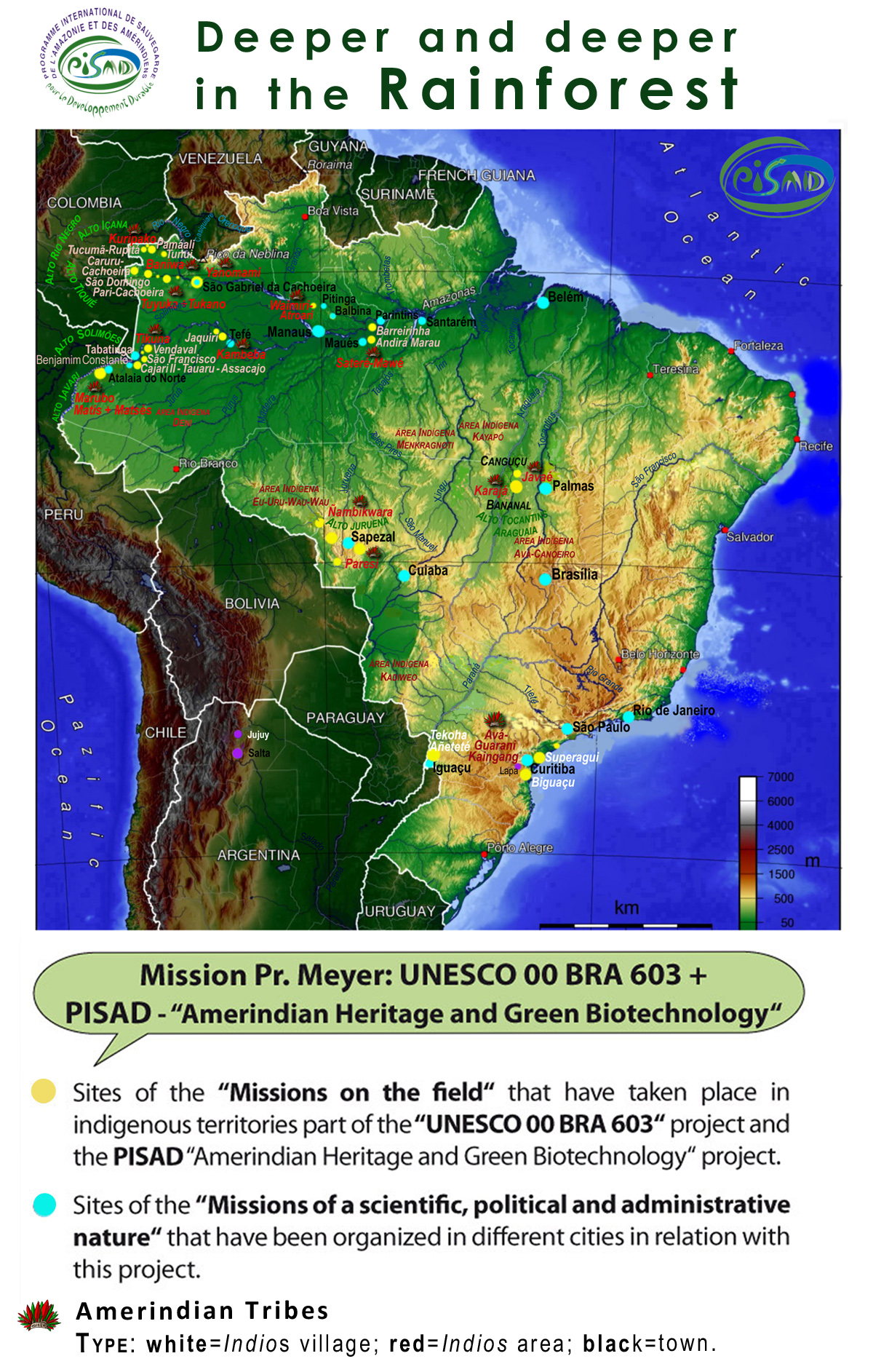
Click on image to enlarge

His missions in the Amazonian rain-forest (see map at right) in close contact with the "People of Nature", the Índios gave him a new conception of Man-Nature interaction. They lead him to combine his expertise in neuro-psychology in the field of linguistic and cultural diversity with his experience in biological diversity and its preservation by bio-technologies.

This association allowed him to fight for the transformation of the Amazonian biodiversity and medicinal plants into a truly genuine pharmacology benefiting both Amazonia and the Western world.

Thus, from 1992 Prof. Dr. Meyer participated as an official member of the State of Amazonas delegation in the UN Earth Summit Rio 92. It is in this context that, in 1994, he coordinated on Brazilian territory – after a due hand-over by the French Ambassador in Brasília – the first Ministerial "mission for biotechnology to valorize biodiversity" ever to be organized between France and the State of Amazonas.

This mission, which had been initiated in 1993 by the French Minister of Research and Space Hubert Curien (via the National Program of Bio-technologies, directed by Prof. Dr. Daniel Thomas), was carried out under the auspices of the French Ministry of Foreign Affairs, with the active involvement of the Governor of the State of Amazonas.

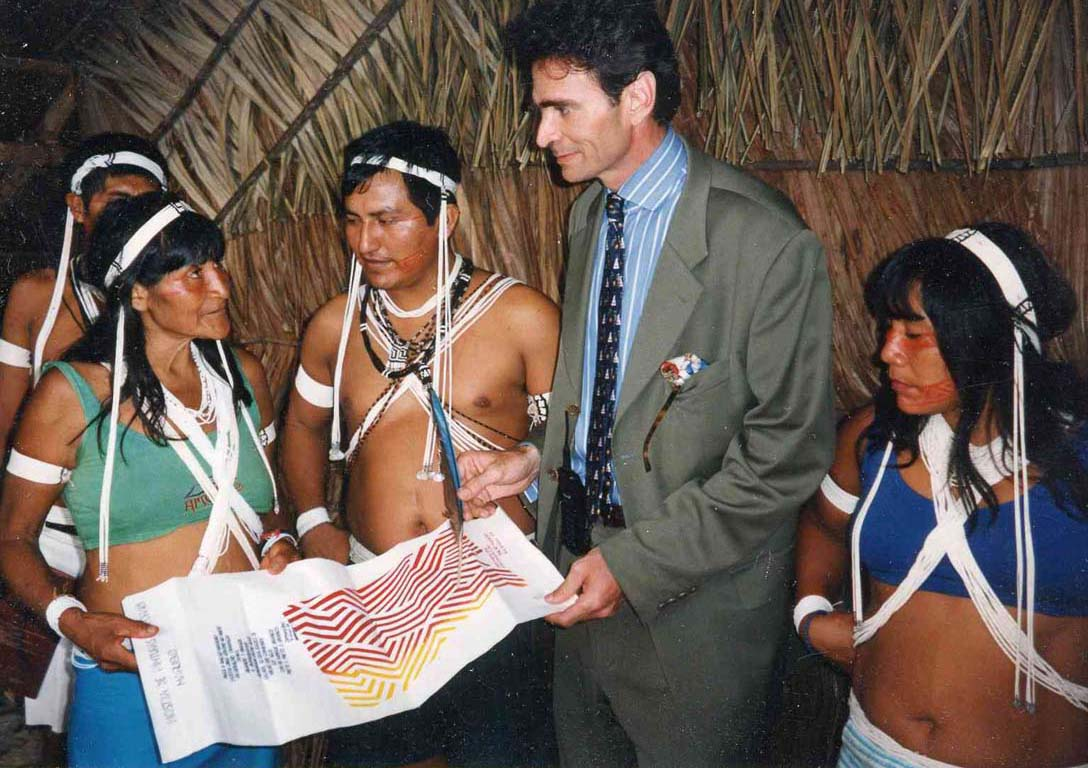
The Chief of the Tribe Marubo, Darcy Duarth Comapa, with Prof. Dr. Meyer at the Alto Javari in the Central Amazônia, discussing Amazonian plants' variety expressed in pictographs

In 1994, Meyer appeared as a special delegate from Brazil to the UNESCO's World Symposium on Literacy in order to present his new approach merging linguistic abilities and biodiversity know how.

In 1999, Dr. Meyer was appointed by UNESCO to write a report on the means to consider in order to establish a "bridge of equitable communication and cooperation" between the Amazonian Amerindians and their traditional knowledge, on the one hand, and the Western world and its modern Culture, on the other hand. The bottom line was to set up the appropriate tools and create the necessary procedures for such a cooperation to be made possible, taking into account the specificity of cultural diversity, the way both these cultures function, and the pragmatic instruments of cooperation.

Since then, he has gone on to found PISAD: Programme International de Sauvegarde de l'Amazônia, Mata Atlântica et des Amérindiens pour le Développement Durable [International Program to Safeguard Amazonia, the Mata Atlântica and the Amerindians for Sustainable Development], a humanist and non-profit organization. To implement it, he has created a "platform of fair and equitable dialogue – a bridge – between preserved Índios and western scientists" to valorize the ancestral knowledge of the Índios and the Amazonian biodiversity. Originally, Meyer set up an operational concept and methodology regarding the psycho-cultural revitalization of endangered Amerindian knowledge which he had pioneered as Cogni'Índios.

=== Recent work ===
Meyer is currently adapting a process for the bio-production of active ingredients contained in medicinal plants to the needs and abilities of the Índios, enabling them to manage the production of these pharmaceuticals and ensuring them economic autonomy and self-sustainable development. This bio-production is based upon the alliance between the Índios' know-how and a green biotechnology (Plant Milking Technology) developed by INPL – Institut National Polytechnique de Lorraine (National Polytechnic Institute of Lorraine), France. UNESCO's Participation Programme entitled "Amerindian Communication and Sustainable Economic Development Programme for a Culture of Peace in Brazilian Amazonia" (00 BRA 603), which Meyer managed from 1999 to 2003, has been a central element of his work and a starting point for his further action.

In the last years, Meyer has been concentrating his activities on the first transfer of the "plant milking technology" to an Índioscommunity in the virgin rain-forest: this is a unique example in recent history of an actual biotechnology transfer to Amerindians. He is now focusing his work on the goal-achievement methodology of his original research and development program to ensure a functional and active link between theÍndios ancestral knowledge and Scientist's advanced biotechnology.

== Health, environmental, social and media impacts ==
For more than three decades, Meyer's work has been published by leading international scientific journals, magazines and books, as well as progressively in the mainstream press, as can be seen in "Selected Publications", up to recent articles.

In this sense, see " Médicaments de demain:l'avenir est sous les tropiques " (Amazonia: Medicines of the Future) cf. his interview in the scientific section "MatchDocument" of the magazine Paris Match (France), 2018, nº 3586, pages 107–108. In the article "Amazonie: Médicaments du Futur" [Amazônia: Medicines of the Future] (Full Web version),chap. "Quel rôle joue l’industrie pharmaceutique dans ces alchimies?" ,it is written :

"Nearly two-thirds of modern medicines come from nature: 35% are directly or indirectly derived from natural molecules, 25% are inspired. We know that nature has a much more elaborate chemistry than synthetic molecules: the natural active principles - fruit of millions of years of trial and error in order to identify their biological utility - have a structure that is much more complex than those of chemical synthesis; today, biotechnologies manage to imitate them via Bio-mimicry. In this sense, the Amazonia is the largest laboratory in the world"

See also "Amazonia, the knowledge class" published in the Franco-Swiss Standard magazine, 2012, nb 37 about the "Financial crisis: a new green bio-economy vs the Knowledge class": Mario Christian Meyer : interview Standard. In the § 6 p. 159 we can read:

"The urgency of safeguarding the primary forests of Amazonia and the preservation of biodiversity leads to inventing other ways for the valorization of this heritage. The project Herb'Içana, that we are trying to implement in agreement with the Chiefs of the Amazonian territories (...) will create green jobs of the future. The big challenge is the transfer of green biotechnology "plant milking technology" (...) to enable Índios to train in bio-production activities."

Meyer has treated other subjects such as pesticides, because of their relevance to health, specially related to cancers, leukaemia, hormonal perturbations… see the article "Du mythe du Timbó à la biotechnologie empirico-naturelle: les biopesticides en question" published in the magazine Hortis, nº 61, pages 55–57.

== About Meyer's work ==
In September 2017, the Herb'Içana project was awarded and received special homage from the Giants of Ecology Institute (Brazil) for its relevance, and was appointed as a solution for the wound n^{o} 7, "loss of biological diversity which affects the lives of all living things", described in the book "12 Feridas Ambientais do Planeta" ["12 Environmental Wounds of the Planet"], coordinated by Gustavo Siqueira and Prof. Dr. Joel Dias da Silva, Brazil, 2017. See the article entitled "Um novo modelo de valorização da biodiversidade: eco-etno-biotecnologia na Amazonia" by Eliana Spengler, Coordinator of the Honorary Committee of the Giants of Ecology Award 2017–2018. See § 3 p. 128 (reference Nb. 25).

== Awards and recognition ==
For his efforts, Meyer was awarded the Brazilian prize Gigante da Ecologia 2008 (Giant of Ecology), an honour tribute by the Instituto Gigantes da Ecologia (Giants of Ecology Institute), in Blumenau, Brazil.

On 21 September 2017, Meyer was again awarded the prize Giant of Ecology 2017 for "Scientific Excellence", as the founder and President of PISAD, thanks to the project Herb'Içana.

On 25 September 2017, Meyer received a high distinction from the French Government through the Ministry of Agriculture, which appointed him Knight of the Order of Merit.

Meyer was made an honorary citizen of the city of Manaus, capital of the State of Amazonas, and was granted a gold medal by its legislative chamber, in recognition of the 30 years of services he provided for the defense of the rich biodiversity of Amazonia and the development of the Herb'Içana project.

== Selected publications ==
=== Scientific publications ===
- Meyer, Mario-Christian (1985). Apprentissage de la langue maternelle écrite : étude sur des populations "les moins favorisées" dans une approche interdisciplinaire [Acquisition of written mother tongue in an interdisciplinary approach] (PDF). Preface by Collège de France, Paris: UNESCO. p. 150.
- Meyer, Mario-Christian (1999). Dictionnaire des drogues, des toxicomanies et des dépendances, Amérindiens d'Amazonie [Encyclopaedic Dictionary of Drugs, Drug-addiction and Dependences, Amerindians from Amazonia] (PDF). Éditions Larousse. p. 435. ISBN 978-2-03-720324-1.
- Meyer, Mario-Christian (January 2021). "Amazonie : le joker de la nouvelle bioéconomie salvatrice" [Amazonia: the joker of the new life-saving bioeconomy] (PDF). À propos (69). Syndicat des journalistes de la presse périodique. ISSN 0752-3076. Archived from the original (PDF) on 20 April 2025. Sometimes referred to as Bulletin du SJPP, founded in 1894.
- Meyer, Mario-Christian (October 1988). "Dépression et nouvelles technologies : perspectives ouvertes" [Depression and new technologies: open perspectives] (PDF). Journal de Psychiatrie Biologique et Thérapeutique (31). M.P.H. Editions: 55–57. ISSN 0292-2509. Includes a Neuroinformatics chapter.
- Meyer, Mario-Christian (June 2017). Modèle de valorisation durable de la biodiversité par la diversité culturelle : alliance entre savoirs ancestraux amérindiens et biotechonologies occidentales [Sustainable biodiversity valorization model through cultural diversity: alliance between ancestral Native American knowledge and biotechnologies] (PDF). International Workshop on "Critique du développement durable" (in French). Nantes, France. A scholarly contribution to the implementation of the UN 2030 Agenda for Sustainable Development Goals, coordinated by Nantes Institute for Advanced Study Foundation and Institute for Advanced Study, in collaboration with Collège de France and Princeton University.
- Meyer, Mario-Christian (1985). "Psychomotricité, mémoire corporelle et éducation" [Psychomotricity, Body Memory and Education.] (PDF). Le corps et sa mémoire: Actes du VIe Congrès international de psychomotricité. Paris: Doin: 85–92. ISBN 978-2-7040-0493-5.
- Meyer, Mario-Christian (January 1987). "Cultural shock, neuropsychological and cognitive functions of symbolization and psychiatric risk" (PDF). Journal de Psychiatrie Biologique et Thérapeutique (24). M.P.H. Editions: 6. ISSN 0292-2509.
- Meyer, Mario-Christian (31 August 2009). "Como o resgate cultural pode ajudar o Índio aculturado e a nossa sociedade?" [How can the cultural rescue help the acculturated Indians and our society?] (PDF). FGV. São Paulo, BR.
- Meyer, Mario-Christian (2016). "Du mythe du Timbó à la biotechnologie empirico-naturelle: les biopesticides en question" [From the myth of Timbó to the empirico-natural biotechnology: the biopesticides in question] (PDF). Hortis, les responsables d'espaces nature en ville (in French). No. 61. De Ville en Ville. pp. 55–58.
- Meyer, Mario-Christian (September 2014). L’Énaction : un cas d’école en Amazonie brésilienne, la Plateforme Éco-Ethno-Biotechnologique, fruit de l’alliance entre savoirs ancestraux amérindiens et biotechnologies vertes occidentales [Enactivism: a textbook case in brazilian Amazonia, eco-ethno-biotechnological platform, fruit of the alliance of ancestral Native American knowledge and western green biotechnologies]. L'homme est mémoire (in French). Bordeaux, France: Bordeaux Montaigne University Department of Neurosciences (published 5 January 2015). Archived from the original on 8 October 2018.

=== General publications ===
- Meyer, Mario-Christian (6 July 2020). "" N'oublions jamais que l'Amazonie est une source inépuisable de savoirs médicaux "" [« Let us never forget that Amazonia is an inexhaustible source of medical knowledge »] (PDF). Le Monde. Paris (France): 3.; official web version: « N’oublions jamais que l’Amazonie est une source inépuisable de savoirs médicaux » (lemonde.fr)
- Meyer, Mario-Christian (1 February 2018). "Médicaments de demain : l'avenir est sous les tropiques" [Tomorrow's medicines: the future is in the tropics]. Paris Match (Interview) (in French). No. 3586. France: Hachette Filipacchi Médias. pp. 105–108. Archived from the original on 7 February 2018.
- Sonia, Racy (19 October 2020). "'O saber ancestral é valioso para bioeconomia'" ['Ancestral knowledge is invaluable to the bioeconomy']. O Estado de S. Paulo (in Portuguese) (46388). ISSN 1516-2931. Archived from the original on 4 May 2025. An interview of Mario-Christian Meyer in Latin America's oldest newspaper, founded in 1875.
- Meyer, Mario-Christian (14 September 2020). "Plantas medicinais da Amazônia no combate à Covid-19" [Amazonian medicinal plants in the fight against Covid-19] (PDF). O Globo. ISSN 2178-5139. Archived from the original on 27 April 2025.
- Meyer, Mario-Christian (17 July 2020). "Coronavirus, Amazônia, índios e o desequilíbrio dos ecossistemas – parte 01" [Coronavirus, Amazonia, Amerindians and the imbalance of ecosystems – part 1]. Jornal do Commercio (Manaus) (43.079). ISSN 1983-0114. Archived from the original on 4 May 2025. Journal founded in 1904.
- Meyer, Mario-Christian (11 July 2020). "Coronavirus, Amazônia, índios e o desequilíbrio dos ecossistemas – parte 02" [Coronavirus, Amazonia, Amerindians and the imbalance of ecosystems – part 2] (PDF). Jornal do Commercio (Manaus) (43.079). ISSN 1983-0114.
- Bloom, Pamela; Meyer, Mario-Christian (1997). "Future of the Forest: A Healing Pharmacy – Sacred and Secret new molecules". Fielding's Amazon: The Adventurer's Guide to the Mysteries of the Amazon (PDF). New York: Fielding Worldwide Inc. pp. 65–71. ISBN 978-1-56952-000-0.
- Meyer, Mario-Christian (8 October 2006). "Parte I - Aliança entre conhecimento tradicional e biotecnologia" [Alliance between traditional knowledge and biotechnology] (PDF). Amazonas Em Tempo. Year 18. 5 (723). Amazonas, BR: 6.
- Meyer, Mario-Christian (15 October 2006). "Parte II - Como o resgate cultural pode ajudar o Índio aculturado e a nossa sociedade" [How cultural recovery can help acculturated Indians and our society] (PDF). Amazonas Em Tempo. Year 18. 5 (730). Amazonas, BR: 6.
- Meyer, Mario-Christian (2007). "Príncipe das Florestas" [The Prince of the Forests] (PDF). EcoFenix (1). São Paulo, BR: 28–31.
- Meyer, Mario-Christian (2009). "The Secrets of Water: from Universe to Cell [Os Segredos da Água: do Universo às Células]". Water, the Soul of Landscapes [Água, Alma das Paisagens.] (PDF). Ipsis Gráfica e Editora. pp. 12–37.
- Meyer, Mario-Christian (26 October 2012). "Amazonie, the knowledge class" [Amazonia, the knowledge class]. Standard (Interview) (in French). No. 37. Faites le Zéro. pp. 158–159. ISSN 1636-4511. Archived from the original on 13 July 2018.
