= René-Georges Gastellier =

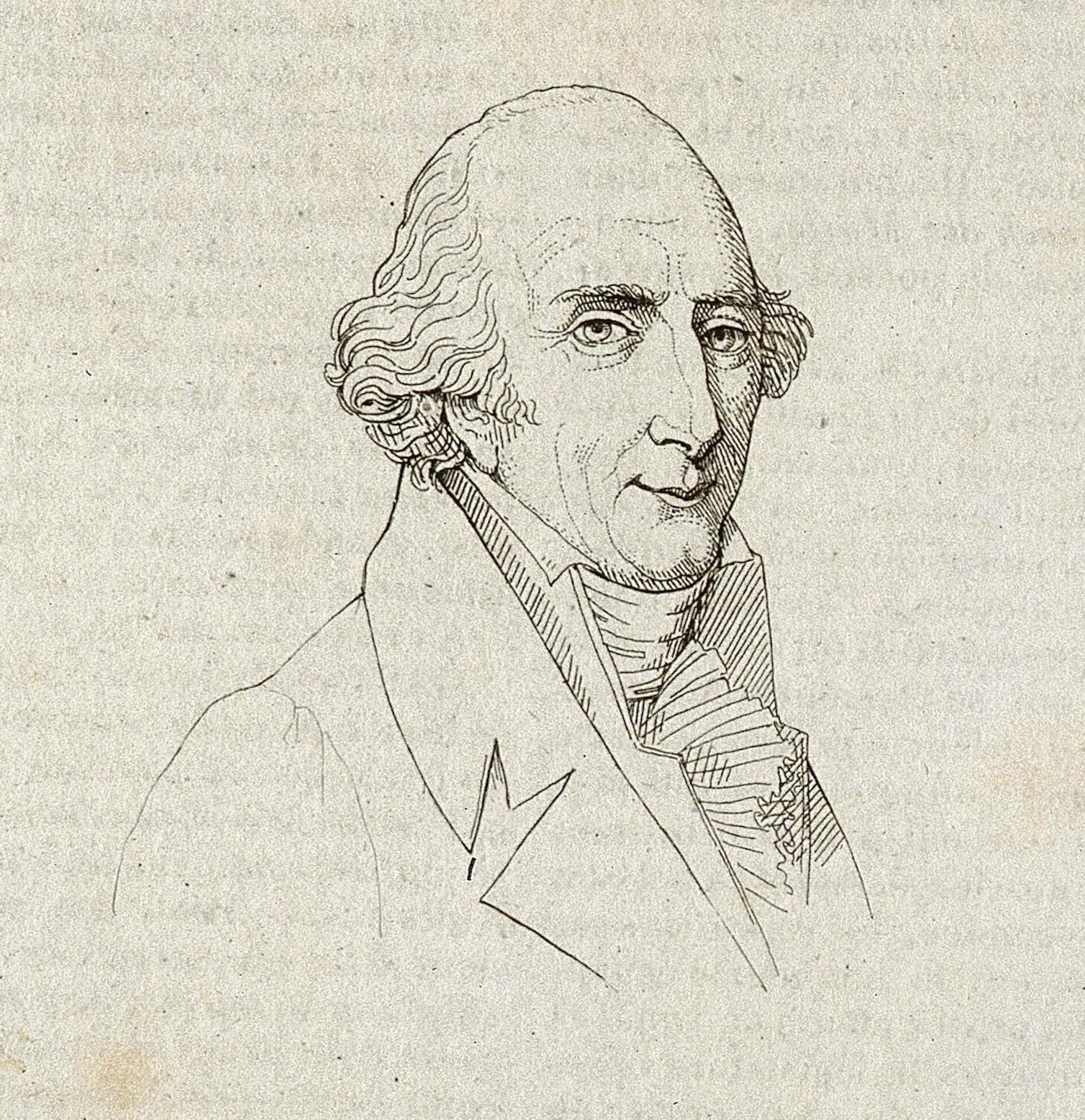
Portrait of René-Georges Gastellier, line engraving by Jacques Marie Noël Frémy after a painting by Lucile Foullon-Vachot, 1821

René-Georges Gastellier (1 October 1741 – 20 November 1821) was a French lawyer, physician, writer, and officeholder.

Born in Ferrières-en-Gâtinais, France, he studied law and then medicine, and began working in Parliament while also serving as physician to the Duc d’Orléans. In 1780 he became the Mayor of Montargis, and then a member of the provincial assembly of Orléans in 1787. He was elected as a member of the American Philosophical Society in 1786.

A popular man, he gained reelection as mayor of Montargis in 1791, gained election as deputy to the legislative assembly in Loiret (1792). His success took a halt upon the onset of the Reign of Terror, whereupon he retired from his legislative offices, and wound up imprisoned and sentenced to death (1794). His luck returned to him, however, when Robespierre’s passing rendered Gastelier's death sentence null and void. After 6 months in behind bars, he regained his freedom.

Thereafter he left Montargis for Paris, where he mainly continued with his writing, having throughout his life published a myriad of works, mainly on medical topics. He also corresponded with figures such as Benjamin Franklin and served alongside the Philadelphian as a member of the Société Royale de Médecin.

In 1817, King Louis XVIII initiated him into the Order of Saint Michael. He died in Paris.
