= Linah Morin =

French sculptor (1866–1923)

Linah Morin (1866 – 25 April 1923), later know as Linah Guillon, was a French sculptor. She was active in Paris from the 1880s to the 1890s.

== Biography ==
Morin was born in 1866 in Paris, France. Until 1887, she resided in Avenue de Villiers 147, the site of the École de sculpture pour femmes, a prominent women's school of sculpture founded by Hélène Bertaux. In 1888 she moved down the road to Avenue de Villiers 45.

Morin became a sculptor. She regularly exhibited her work at the Paris Salons between 1885 and 1891. Her work focused on portraits and allegorical themes, with a strong preference for busts. In 1889, she attained full membership status as a societaire (Sre) of the Société des Artistes Français.

She married Dr. Paul Guillon, the former secretary-general and president of the Société de médecine de Paris. She died on 25 April 1923 in Saint-Quay-Portrieux, Brittany, France.

== Selected works ==
Name	Year	Type	Material	Notes	Location
Après le bal ("After the Ball")	1885	Bust	Plaster (plâtre)		Salon du 1885, Palais de l'Industrie
Portrait de Madame M.P.	1886	Medallion	Marble (marbre)		Salon du 1886, Palais de l'Industrie
Enfant au repos ("Child at Rest")	1887	Statue	Plaster (plâtre)		Salon du 1887, Palais de l'Industrie
Paula	1887	Bust	Plaster (plâtre)		Salon du 1887, Palais de l'Industrie
Portrait de Mademoiselle L. M.	1888	Bust	Plaster (plâtre)		Salon du 1888, Palais de l'Industrie
Le Soir ("The Evening")	1890	Bust	Plaster (plâtre)	Art Critic Alexis Martin described the bust as a 'noteworthy work'	Salon du 1890, Palais de l'Industrie
Rêverie ("Daydream")	1891	Bust	Plaster (plâtre)	Described as 'a head of a young girl, lost in reverie'. Art critic Lavergne commended the work as showing 'great promise'.	l'Union des femmes peintres et sculpteurs 10th Exhibition, Palais de l'Industrie Salon du 1891, Palais de l'Industrie
