= Paris Society of Medicine =

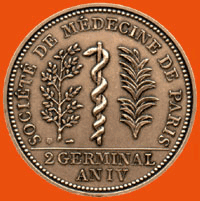
- Formation: 1730
- Type: Medical organization, Societe savante, Non-profit organization
- Location: Paris, France
- Website: http://www.socmedparis.org/
- Formerly called: Société Royale de Médecine

The Paris Society of Medicine (French: Société de Médecine de Paris) is a medical organization based in Paris, France. Its predecessor, the Société Royale de Médecine, was founded in 1730, and the society's current incarnation was founded in 1878.

== Historical background ==
The society originates from the Société Royale de Médecine, which was founded in 1730. The "Société Royale de Médecine" was reformed in 1778, only to be abolished by the French Revolution by way of the law of "20 Thermidor Year I" (French revolutionary calendar, i.e. August 8, 1793). The Société de Médecine de Paris was founded on "2 Germinal Year IV" (French revolutionary calendar, i.e. March 22, 1796). The present society is an officially recognized non-profit organization by decree from February 5, 1878.

== Overview ==
The Société de Médecine de Paris is an independent and interdisciplinary medical society that is open to professors, hospital physicians, clinicians, general practitioners or specialists, surgeons, biologists, and others. It is intended to support continuing medical education. During the plenary and ordinary sessions, everyone can freely express themselves, and specialists and lecturers can present the current state of research and knowledge in their field.

From its inception it has brought together many of the most famous physicians of the time, and has been chaired by Jean-Louis Baudelocque, René-Nicolas Dufriche Desgenettes, Dominique Jean Larrey, Jean-Étienne Dominique Esquirol, Ernest Besnier, and Pierre-Constant Budin. Georges Clemenceau has been an honorary president. More recently, the presidents have been Edmond Lesné, Victor Pauchet, and Jean Lhermitte.

Today, the Paris Society of Medicine brings together researchers and practitioners from different fields of advanced medicine, such as Gabriel Blancher, fellow of the French Academy of Medicine... but also specialists applying the results of medical research in other areas of current interest in Research and Development, e. g. the "Human and Environmental Health", such as Mario Christian Meyer.

== See also ==
- Royal Commission on Animal Magnetism – 1784 French scientific bodies' investigations involving systematic controlled trials
