= Julian de Ajuriaguerra =

- Born: 7 January 1911; Bilbao, Spain
- Died: May 23, 1993 (aged 82); Villefranque (Pyrénées-Atlantiques)
- Citizenship: Spain, France
- Scientific career
- Fields: Neuropsychiatry, neuropsychology, psychoanalysis, child psychiatry, sectoral psychiatry
- Workplaces: Collège de France; Bel-Air Psychiatric Hospital

Julian de Ajuriaguerra (born January 7, 1911, at Bilbao (Spanish Basque Country) and died at Villefranque (French Basque Country) on March 23, 1993) was a Spanish-French neuropsychiatrist and psychoanalyst of Basque origin. He is one of the pioneers of "sectoral psychiatry" in France.

== Biography ==
Brought up in Bilbao in a traditional family, he left for Paris at the age of 16, where he studied medicine. He becomes a non-resident student in psychiatry at Sainte-Anne Hospital. Because of his status as a foreign student, he was not paid until 1950, so he was compelled to work on night duty until the prohibition of this practice under the Vichy regime.

He attended the seminars on Gaetan Gatian de Clérambault and Pierre Janetin particular, and took an interest in the Surrealists. He finished his medical studies both in France and Spain, where the Civil War prevented him from taking his final exams.

His thesis, pain in the disease of the central nervous system, concluded in 1936, and was prefaced by Jean Lhermitte, for whom he would become assistant in the Laboratory of the anatomy of the nervous system from 1938 to 1946. A member of the French Resistance during the war, he passed the aggregation examination and was appointed professor of neurology and psychiatry.

Ajuriaguerra met the psychoanalyst René Diatkine, with whom he opened a consulting office for psychomotricity and language problems. They created the scientific magazine Child Psychiatry. He then underwent a psychoanalysis with Sacha Nacht.

In 1950, Ajuriaguerra obtained French Nationality which allowed him to pass the "baccalaureat" examination and obtain the recognition of his title as a doctor.

In 1959, he replaced Professor Ferdinand Morel at the Bel-Air psychiatric hospital in Geneva, which he directed until 1975. He enabled psychiatry in Geneva to develop and become a reference. Psychoanalysts worked together with neurologists in spirit of emulation and collaboration rarely attained in this domain. He also perfected his technique of relaxation, the "Ajuriaguerra method".

He then left Geneva for Paris, where he became professor at the Collège de France. This institution provided Prof. Dr. Ajuriaguerra the support to express the deep insight of his neuropsychiatric and humanistic approach. He then became a reference and has influenced a whole new generation of researchers in medical and life sciences, as illustrated in the work of Prof. Dr. Mario Christian Meyer.

He continued an intense activity of research and teaching both in France and Spain. In 1986, he terminated his professional activities due to illness.

== Tribute ==
Tribute to the work of Julian de Ajuriaguerra: A precursor of the current movement of cognitive sciences

2011 is celebrated the centenary of the birth of Julian Ajuriaguerra (1911–2011) and a tribute will be made on 10 and 11 June in Bayonne (France) and Bilbao (Spain). The objective of these days is to recall the life and work of Julian de Ajuriaguerra in their topicality. Clinicians, researchers and representatives of associations from Biscay, Bordeaux, Dijon, Lyon and Geneva will participate in these encounters.

== Publications ==
- de Ajuriaguerra, Julian (1980). Manuel de psychiatrie de l'enfant. Masson. ISBN 2-225-39688-4.
- de Ajuriaguerra, Julian (1989). "tome 1". L'Écriture de l'enfant. Delachaux & Niestle. ISBN 2-603-00670-3.

== Bibliography ==
- J.M. Aguirre Oar et J. Guimon Ugatechea, Vie et oeuvre de Julian de Ajuriaguerra", Masson, 1996, |ISBN 2-225-84526-3
- Siguán M., 1994, Julián de Ajurriaguerra. In Memoriam : el hombre y la obra. 1911–1993, Rev. Logop. Fon. Audiol., 14, 2, 73 – 84.
- Bergeron M., "Julian de Ajuriaguerra (1911–1993)", Bulletin de psychologie, Tome 46 (11–15), N°411, 1993, p. 637-638.
