= Société royale de médecine =

French medical organization

Société royale de médecine, Royal Society of Medicine was founded in 1778 and was a predecessor of Paris Society of Medicine.

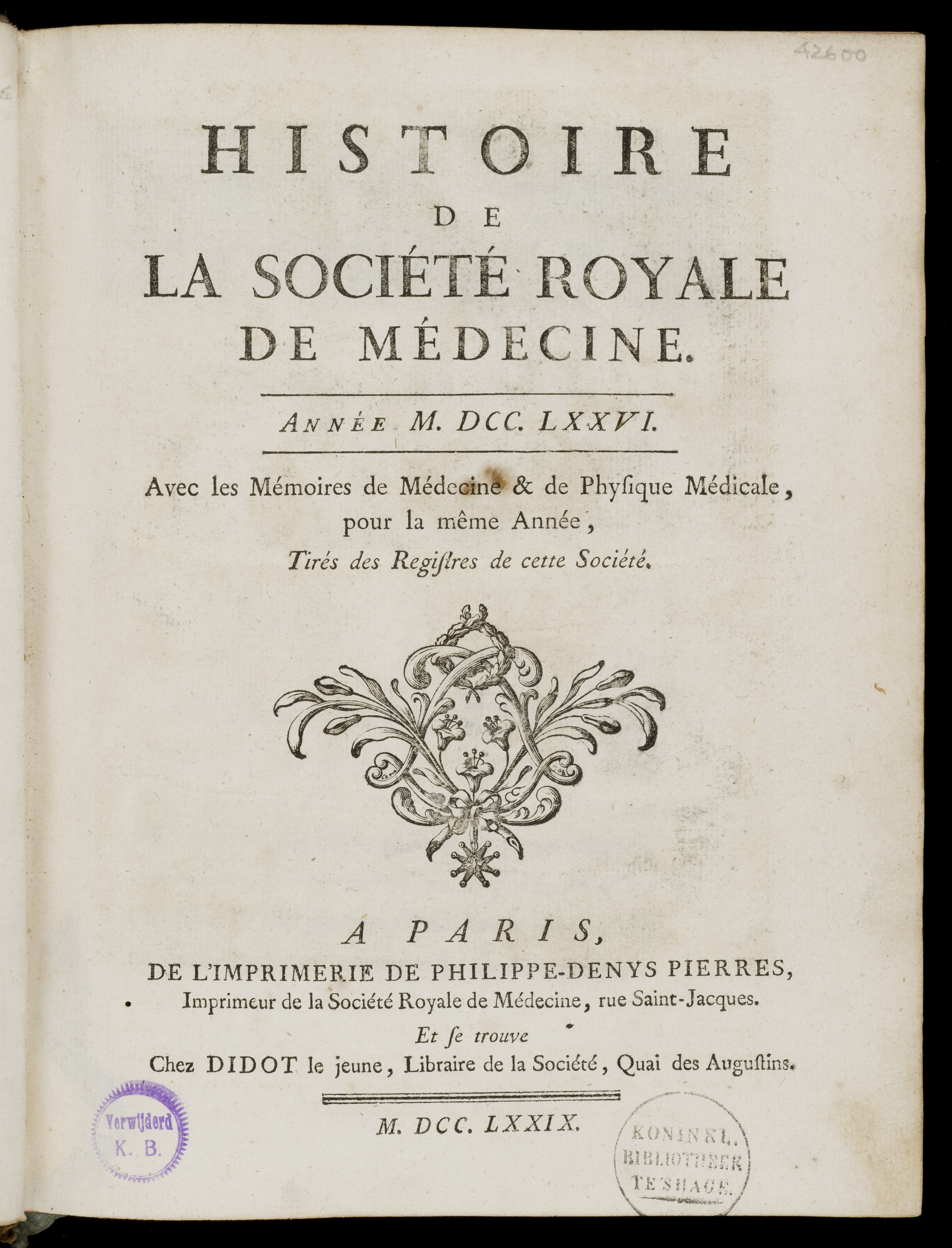
