= Germinal (month) =

7th month in the French Republican calendar

Germinal (French pronunciation: [ʒɛʁminal]) is the seventh month in the French Republican Calendar. The month was named after the Latin word germen 'germination'. Germinal was the first month of the spring quarter (mois de printemps). It started March 21 or March 22, and ended April 19 or April 20. It follows Ventôse and precedes Floréal.

In the context of the French Revolution, Germinal sometimes refers to the downfall and execution of the Indulgents, Georges Danton and Camille Desmoulins, which took place during Germinal of 1794, four months before the Thermidorian Reaction in which Robespierre himself was executed. The events of Germinal 1794 signaled the beginning of the end of the Reign of Terror.

Year: 3
Month: Germinal
Year: III

Day of the 10-day
week (décade)
Primidi
Duodi
Tridi
Quartidi
Quintidi
Sextidi
Septidi
Octidi
Nonidi
Décadi

décade 19
1	Saturday; 21 March 1795
2	Sunday; 22 March 1795
3	Monday; 23 March 1795
4	Tuesday; 24 March 1795
5	Wednesday; 25 March 1795
6	Thursday; 26 March 1795
7	Friday; 27 March 1795
8	Saturday; 28 March 1795
9	Sunday; 29 March 1795
10	Monday; 30 March 1795

décade 20
11	Tuesday; 31 March 1795
12	Wednesday; 1 April 1795
13	Thursday; 2 April 1795
14	Friday; 3 April 1795
15	Saturday; 4 April 1795
16	Sunday; 5 April 1795
17	Monday; 6 April 1795
18	Tuesday; 7 April 1795
19	Wednesday; 8 April 1795
20	Thursday; 9 April 1795

décade 21
21	Friday; 10 April 1795
22	Saturday; 11 April 1795
23	Sunday; 12 April 1795
24	Monday; 13 April 1795
25	Tuesday; 14 April 1795
26	Wednesday; 15 April 1795
27	Thursday; 16 April 1795
28	Friday; 17 April 1795
29	Saturday; 18 April 1795
30	Sunday; 19 April 1795

Decimal time – 10 h/day
Paris
0h64m81s

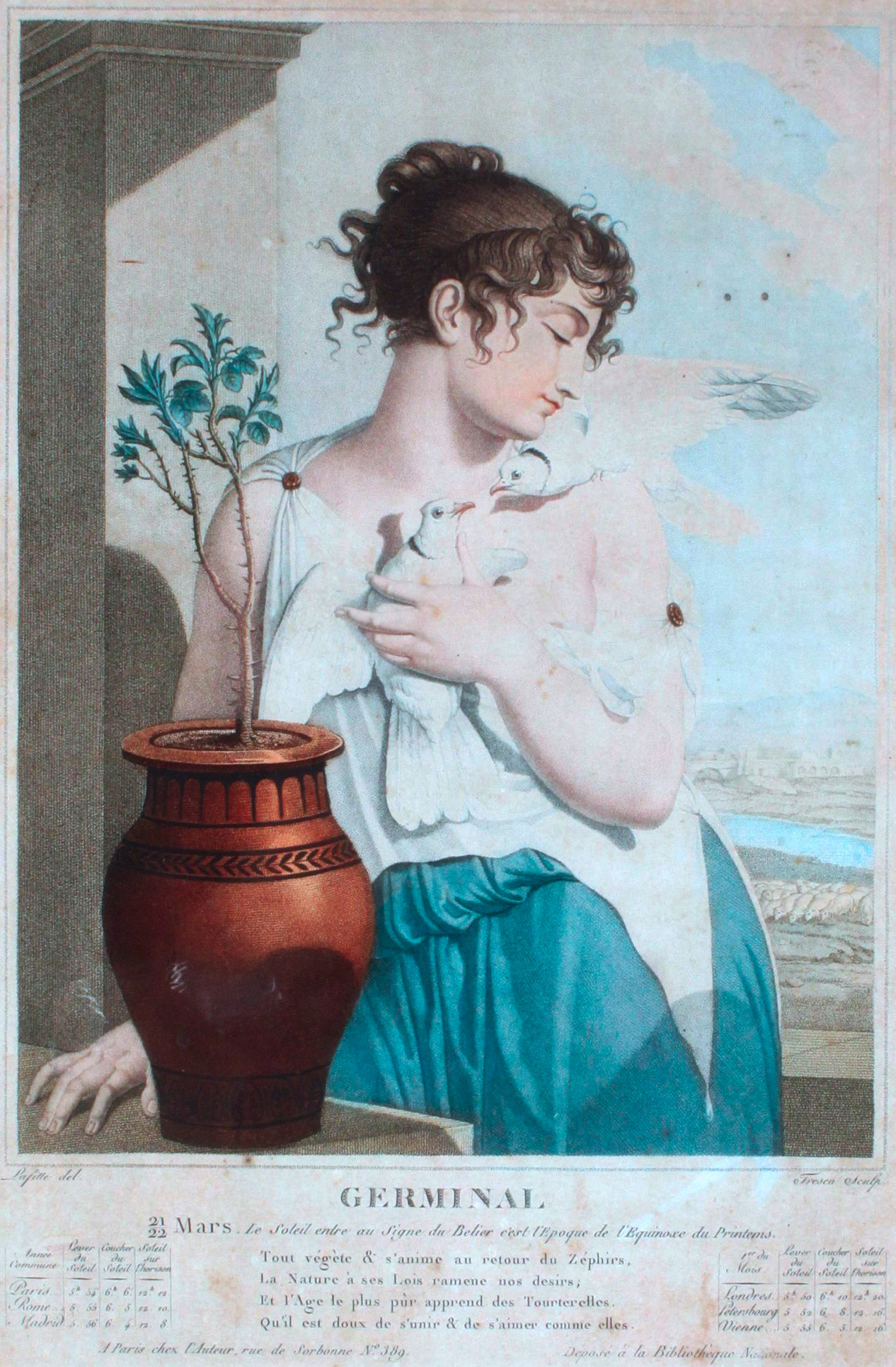
Germinal

01:23:59
Time of day - 24 h/day
Greenwich

Conversion between Republican and Gregorian calendar for the years I - XIV

Year: 1
Month: Germinal
Year: I

Day of the 10-day
week (décade)
Primidi
Duodi
Tridi
Quartidi
Quintidi
Sextidi
Septidi
Octidi
Nonidi
Décadi

décade 19
1	Thursday; 21 March 1793
2	Friday; 22 March 1793
3	Saturday; 23 March 1793
4	Sunday; 24 March 1793
5	Monday; 25 March 1793
6	Tuesday; 26 March 1793
7	Wednesday; 27 March 1793
8	Thursday; 28 March 1793
9	Friday; 29 March 1793
10	Saturday; 30 March 1793

décade 20
11	Sunday; 31 March 1793
12	Monday; 1 April 1793
13	Tuesday; 2 April 1793
14	Wednesday; 3 April 1793
15	Thursday; 4 April 1793
16	Friday; 5 April 1793
17	Saturday; 6 April 1793
18	Sunday; 7 April 1793
19	Monday; 8 April 1793
20	Tuesday; 9 April 1793

décade 21
21	Wednesday; 10 April 1793
22	Thursday; 11 April 1793
23	Friday; 12 April 1793
24	Saturday; 13 April 1793
25	Sunday; 14 April 1793
26	Monday; 15 April 1793
27	Tuesday; 16 April 1793
28	Wednesday; 17 April 1793
29	Thursday; 18 April 1793
30	Friday; 19 April 1793

Decimal time – 10 h/day
Paris
0:58:32

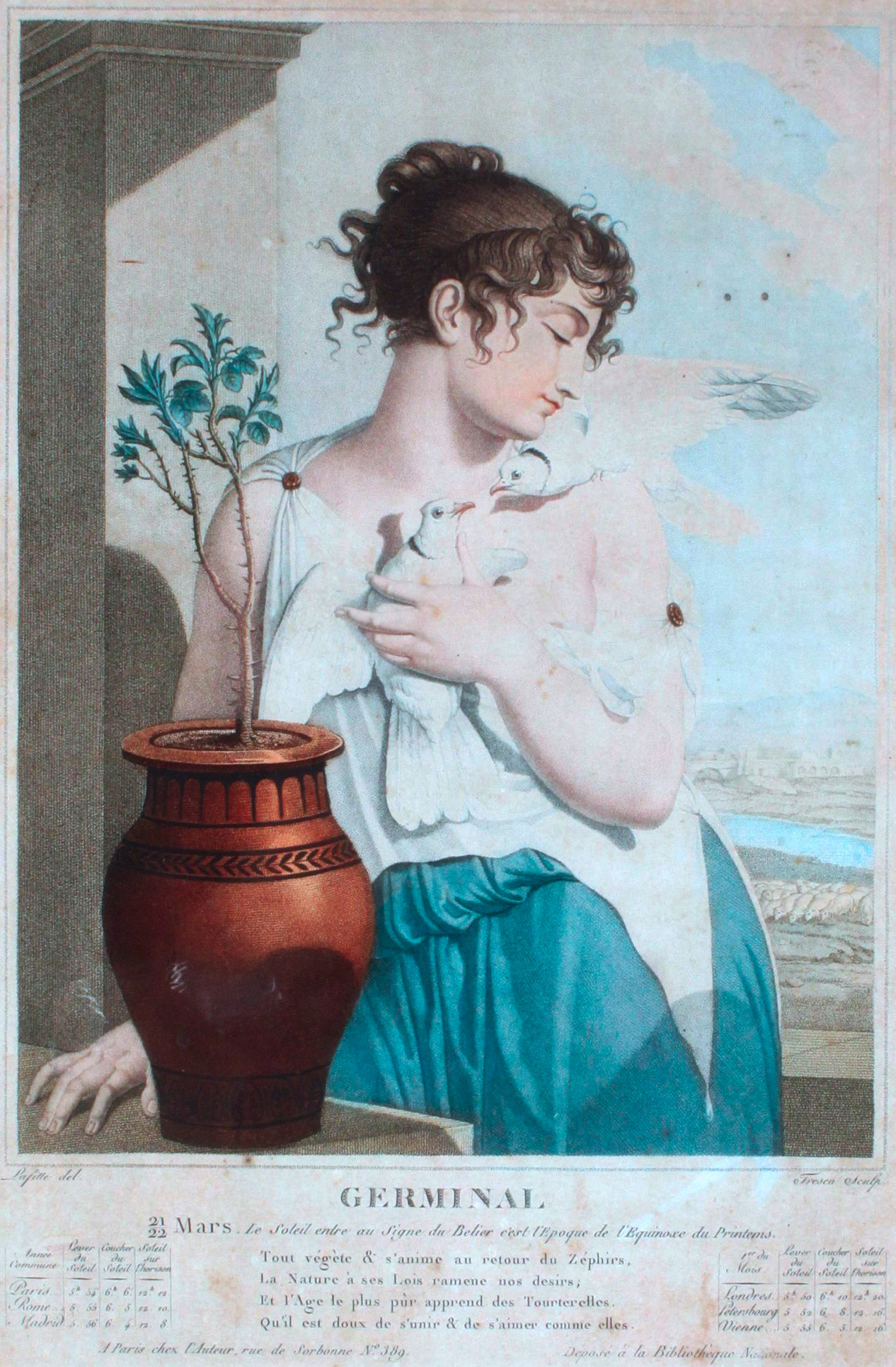
Germinal

01:23:59
Time of day - 24 h/day
Greenwich

Year: 2
Month: Germinal
Year: II

Day of the 10-day
week (décade)
Primidi
Duodi
Tridi
Quartidi
Quintidi
Sextidi
Septidi
Octidi
Nonidi
Décadi

décade 19
1	Friday; 21 March 1794
2	Saturday; 22 March 1794
3	Sunday; 23 March 1794
4	Monday; 24 March 1794
5	Tuesday; 25 March 1794
6	Wednesday; 26 March 1794
7	Thursday; 27 March 1794
8	Friday; 28 March 1794
9	Saturday; 29 March 1794
10	Sunday; 30 March 1794

décade 20
11	Monday; 31 March 1794
12	Tuesday; 1 April 1794
13	Wednesday; 2 April 1794
14	Thursday; 3 April 1794
15	Friday; 4 April 1794
16	Saturday; 5 April 1794
17	Sunday; 6 April 1794
18	Monday; 7 April 1794
19	Tuesday; 8 April 1794
20	Wednesday; 9 April 1794

décade 21
21	Thursday; 10 April 1794
22	Friday; 11 April 1794
23	Saturday; 12 April 1794
24	Sunday; 13 April 1794
25	Monday; 14 April 1794
26	Tuesday; 15 April 1794
27	Wednesday; 16 April 1794
28	Thursday; 17 April 1794
29	Friday; 18 April 1794
30	Saturday; 19 April 1794

Decimal time – 10 h/day
Paris
0:58:32

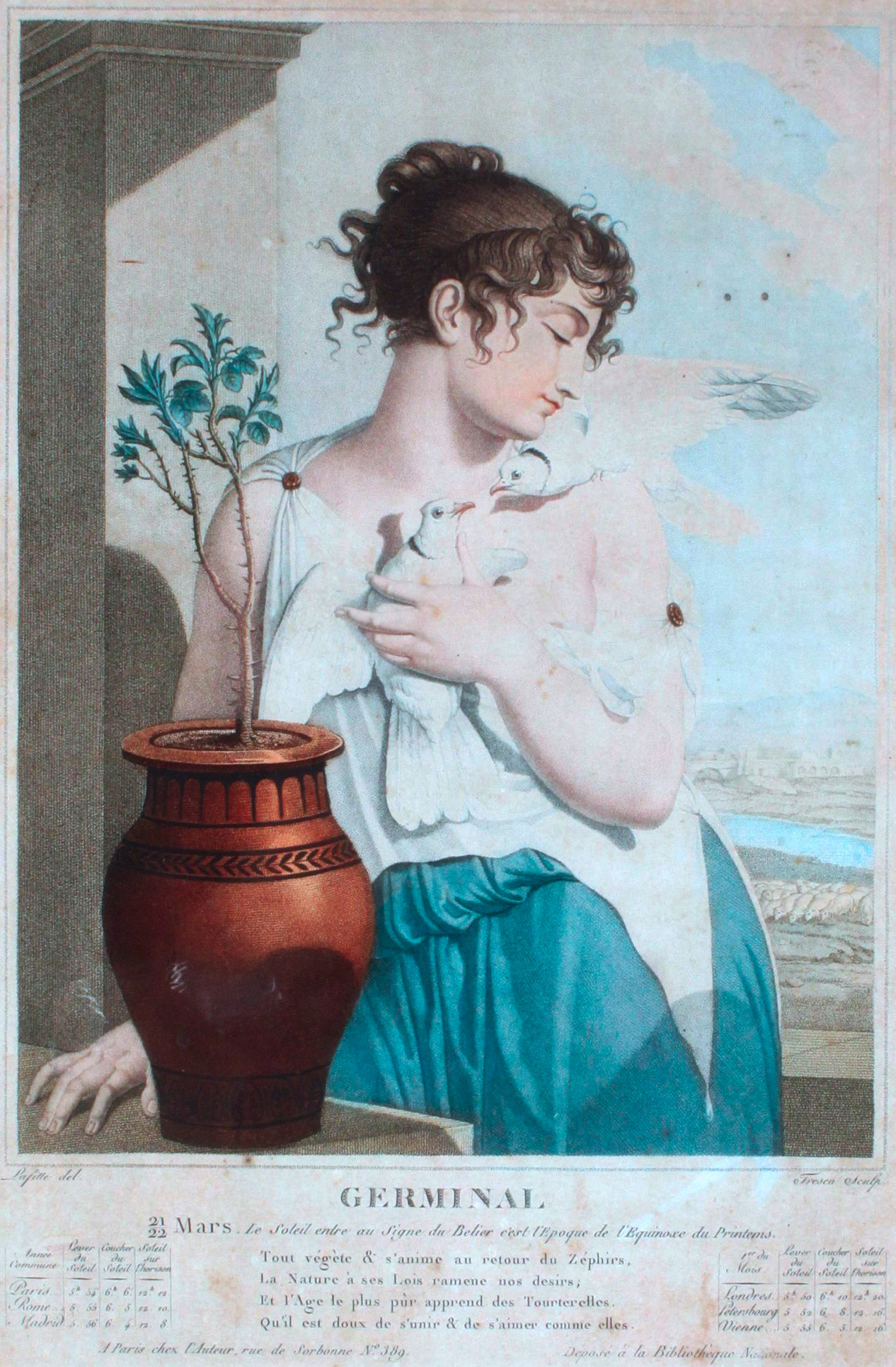
Germinal

01:23:59
Time of day - 24 h/day
Greenwich

Year: 3
Month: Germinal
Year: III

Day of the 10-day
week (décade)
Primidi
Duodi
Tridi
Quartidi
Quintidi
Sextidi
Septidi
Octidi
Nonidi
Décadi

décade 19
1	Saturday; 21 March 1795
2	Sunday; 22 March 1795
3	Monday; 23 March 1795
4	Tuesday; 24 March 1795
5	Wednesday; 25 March 1795
6	Thursday; 26 March 1795
7	Friday; 27 March 1795
8	Saturday; 28 March 1795
9	Sunday; 29 March 1795
10	Monday; 30 March 1795

décade 20
11	Tuesday; 31 March 1795
12	Wednesday; 1 April 1795
13	Thursday; 2 April 1795
14	Friday; 3 April 1795
15	Saturday; 4 April 1795
16	Sunday; 5 April 1795
17	Monday; 6 April 1795
18	Tuesday; 7 April 1795
19	Wednesday; 8 April 1795
20	Thursday; 9 April 1795

décade 21
21	Friday; 10 April 1795
22	Saturday; 11 April 1795
23	Sunday; 12 April 1795
24	Monday; 13 April 1795
25	Tuesday; 14 April 1795
26	Wednesday; 15 April 1795
27	Thursday; 16 April 1795
28	Friday; 17 April 1795
29	Saturday; 18 April 1795
30	Sunday; 19 April 1795

Decimal time – 10 h/day
Paris
0:58:32

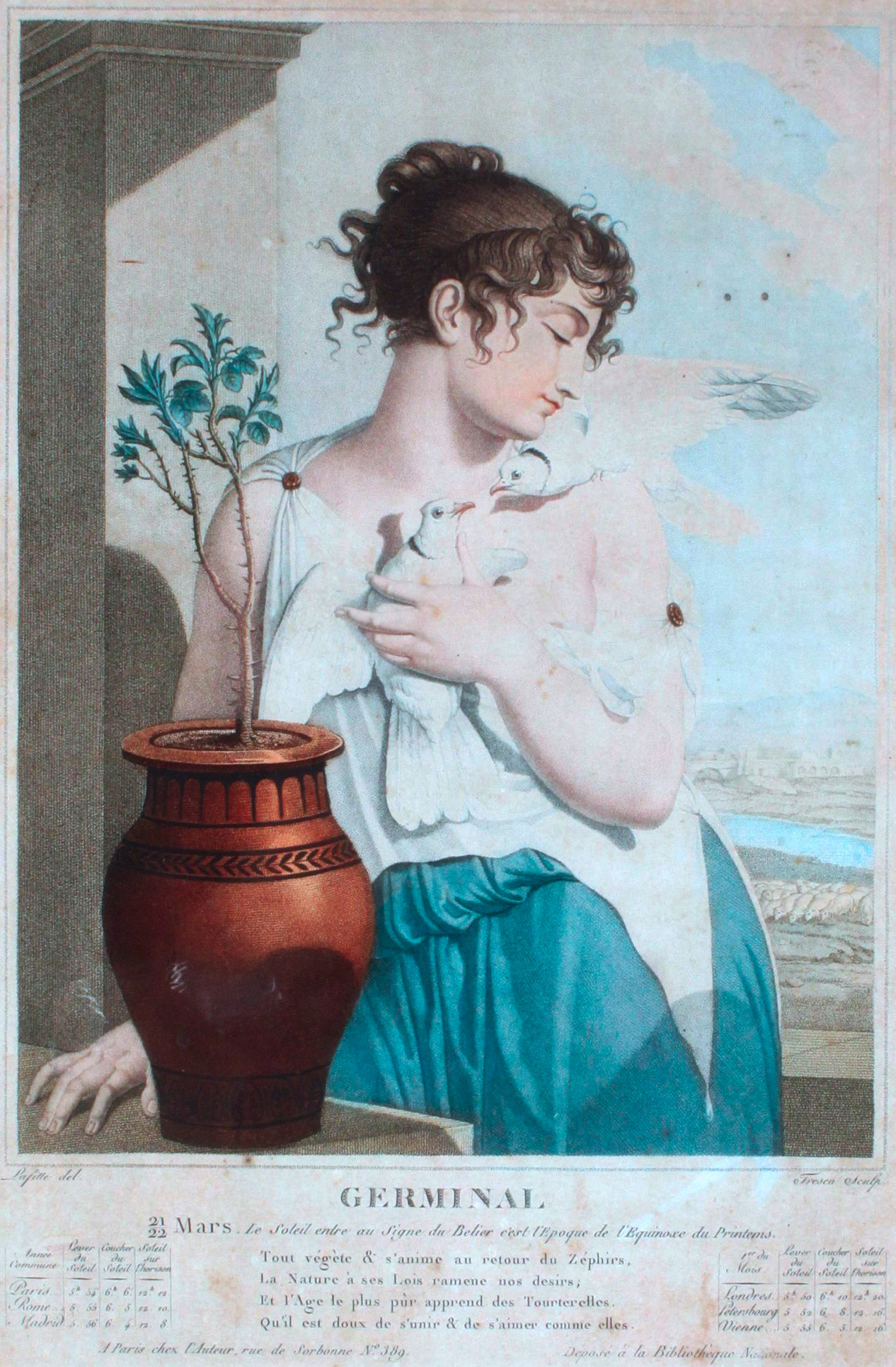
Germinal

01:23:59
Time of day - 24 h/day
Greenwich

Year: 4
Month: Germinal
Year: IV

Day of the 10-day
week (décade)
Primidi
Duodi
Tridi
Quartidi
Quintidi
Sextidi
Septidi
Octidi
Nonidi
Décadi

décade 19
1	Monday; 21 March 1796
2	Tuesday; 22 March 1796
3	Wednesday; 23 March 1796
4	Thursday; 24 March 1796
5	Friday; 25 March 1796
6	Saturday; 26 March 1796
7	Sunday; 27 March 1796
8	Monday; 28 March 1796
9	Tuesday; 29 March 1796
10	Wednesday; 30 March 1796

décade 20
11	Thursday; 31 March 1796
12	Friday; 1 April 1796
13	Saturday; 2 April 1796
14	Sunday; 3 April 1796
15	Monday; 4 April 1796
16	Tuesday; 5 April 1796
17	Wednesday; 6 April 1796
18	Thursday; 7 April 1796
19	Friday; 8 April 1796
20	Saturday; 9 April 1796

décade 21
21	Sunday; 10 April 1796
22	Monday; 11 April 1796
23	Tuesday; 12 April 1796
24	Wednesday; 13 April 1796
25	Thursday; 14 April 1796
26	Friday; 15 April 1796
27	Saturday; 16 April 1796
28	Sunday; 17 April 1796
29	Monday; 18 April 1796
30	Tuesday; 19 April 1796

Decimal time – 10 h/day
Paris
0:58:32

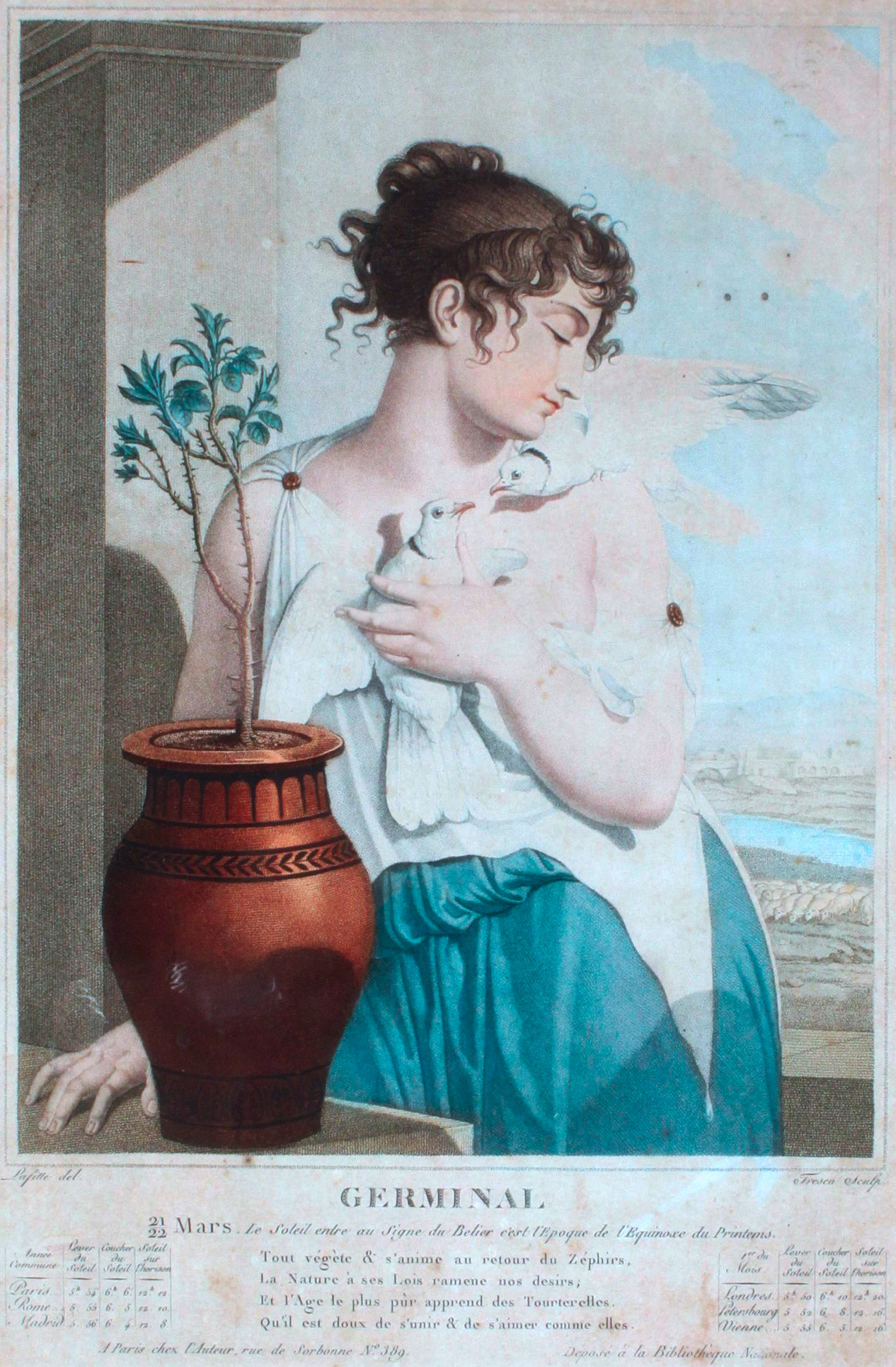
Germinal

01:23:59
Time of day - 24 h/day
Greenwich

Year: 5
Month: Germinal
Year: V

Day of the 10-day
week (décade)
Primidi
Duodi
Tridi
Quartidi
Quintidi
Sextidi
Septidi
Octidi
Nonidi
Décadi

décade 19
1	Tuesday; 21 March 1797
2	Wednesday; 22 March 1797
3	Thursday; 23 March 1797
4	Friday; 24 March 1797
5	Saturday; 25 March 1797
6	Sunday; 26 March 1797
7	Monday; 27 March 1797
8	Tuesday; 28 March 1797
9	Wednesday; 29 March 1797
10	Thursday; 30 March 1797

décade 20
11	Friday; 31 March 1797
12	Saturday; 1 April 1797
13	Sunday; 2 April 1797
14	Monday; 3 April 1797
15	Tuesday; 4 April 1797
16	Wednesday; 5 April 1797
17	Thursday; 6 April 1797
18	Friday; 7 April 1797
19	Saturday; 8 April 1797
20	Sunday; 9 April 1797

décade 21
21	Monday; 10 April 1797
22	Tuesday; 11 April 1797
23	Wednesday; 12 April 1797
24	Thursday; 13 April 1797
25	Friday; 14 April 1797
26	Saturday; 15 April 1797
27	Sunday; 16 April 1797
28	Monday; 17 April 1797
29	Tuesday; 18 April 1797
30	Wednesday; 19 April 1797

Decimal time – 10 h/day
Paris
0:58:32

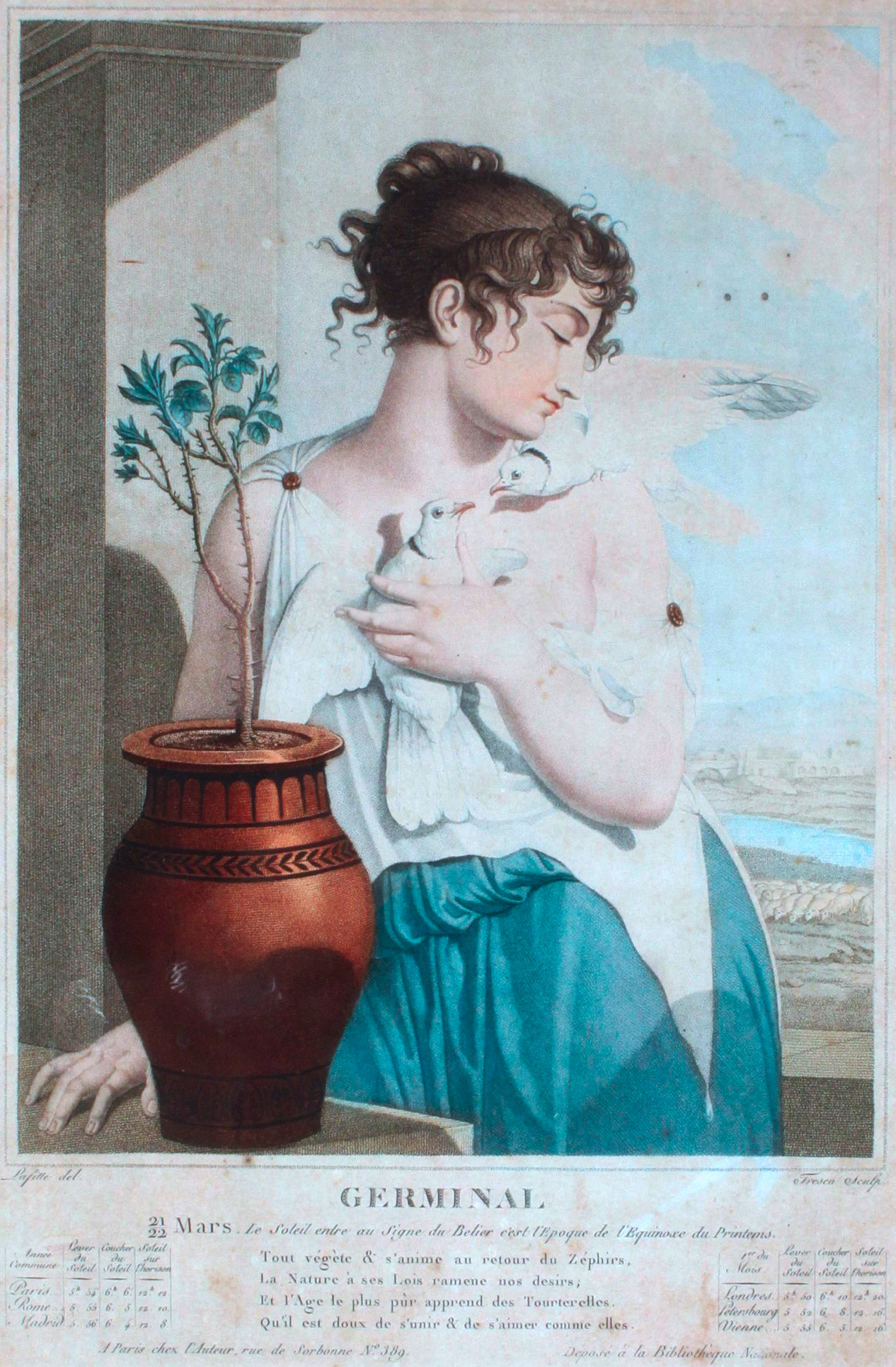
Germinal

01:23:59
Time of day - 24 h/day
Greenwich

Year: 6
Month: Germinal
Year: VI

Day of the 10-day
week (décade)
Primidi
Duodi
Tridi
Quartidi
Quintidi
Sextidi
Septidi
Octidi
Nonidi
Décadi

décade 19
1	Wednesday; 21 March 1798
2	Thursday; 22 March 1798
3	Friday; 23 March 1798
4	Saturday; 24 March 1798
5	Sunday; 25 March 1798
6	Monday; 26 March 1798
7	Tuesday; 27 March 1798
8	Wednesday; 28 March 1798
9	Thursday; 29 March 1798
10	Friday; 30 March 1798

décade 20
11	Saturday; 31 March 1798
12	Sunday; 1 April 1798
13	Monday; 2 April 1798
14	Tuesday; 3 April 1798
15	Wednesday; 4 April 1798
16	Thursday; 5 April 1798
17	Friday; 6 April 1798
18	Saturday; 7 April 1798
19	Sunday; 8 April 1798
20	Monday; 9 April 1798

décade 21
21	Tuesday; 10 April 1798
22	Wednesday; 11 April 1798
23	Thursday; 12 April 1798
24	Friday; 13 April 1798
25	Saturday; 14 April 1798
26	Sunday; 15 April 1798
27	Monday; 16 April 1798
28	Tuesday; 17 April 1798
29	Wednesday; 18 April 1798
30	Thursday; 19 April 1798

Decimal time – 10 h/day
Paris
0:58:32

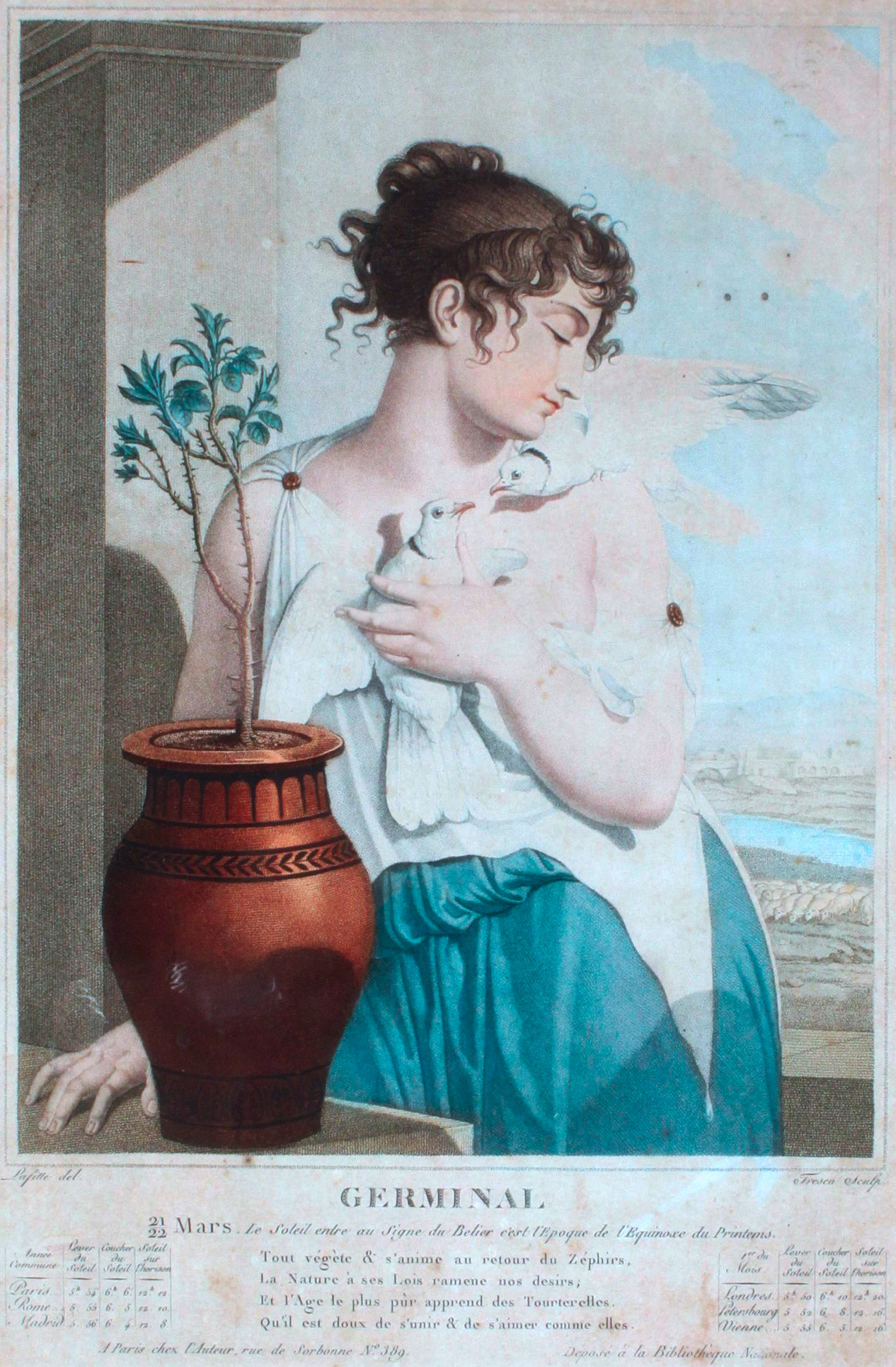
Germinal

01:23:59
Time of day - 24 h/day
Greenwich

Year: 7
Month: Germinal
Year: VII

Day of the 10-day
week (décade)
Primidi
Duodi
Tridi
Quartidi
Quintidi
Sextidi
Septidi
Octidi
Nonidi
Décadi

décade 19
1	Thursday; 21 March 1799
2	Friday; 22 March 1799
3	Saturday; 23 March 1799
4	Sunday; 24 March 1799
5	Monday; 25 March 1799
6	Tuesday; 26 March 1799
7	Wednesday; 27 March 1799
8	Thursday; 28 March 1799
9	Friday; 29 March 1799
10	Saturday; 30 March 1799

décade 20
11	Sunday; 31 March 1799
12	Monday; 1 April 1799
13	Tuesday; 2 April 1799
14	Wednesday; 3 April 1799
15	Thursday; 4 April 1799
16	Friday; 5 April 1799
17	Saturday; 6 April 1799
18	Sunday; 7 April 1799
19	Monday; 8 April 1799
20	Tuesday; 9 April 1799

décade 21
21	Wednesday; 10 April 1799
22	Thursday; 11 April 1799
23	Friday; 12 April 1799
24	Saturday; 13 April 1799
25	Sunday; 14 April 1799
26	Monday; 15 April 1799
27	Tuesday; 16 April 1799
28	Wednesday; 17 April 1799
29	Thursday; 18 April 1799
30	Friday; 19 April 1799

Decimal time – 10 h/day
Paris
0:58:32

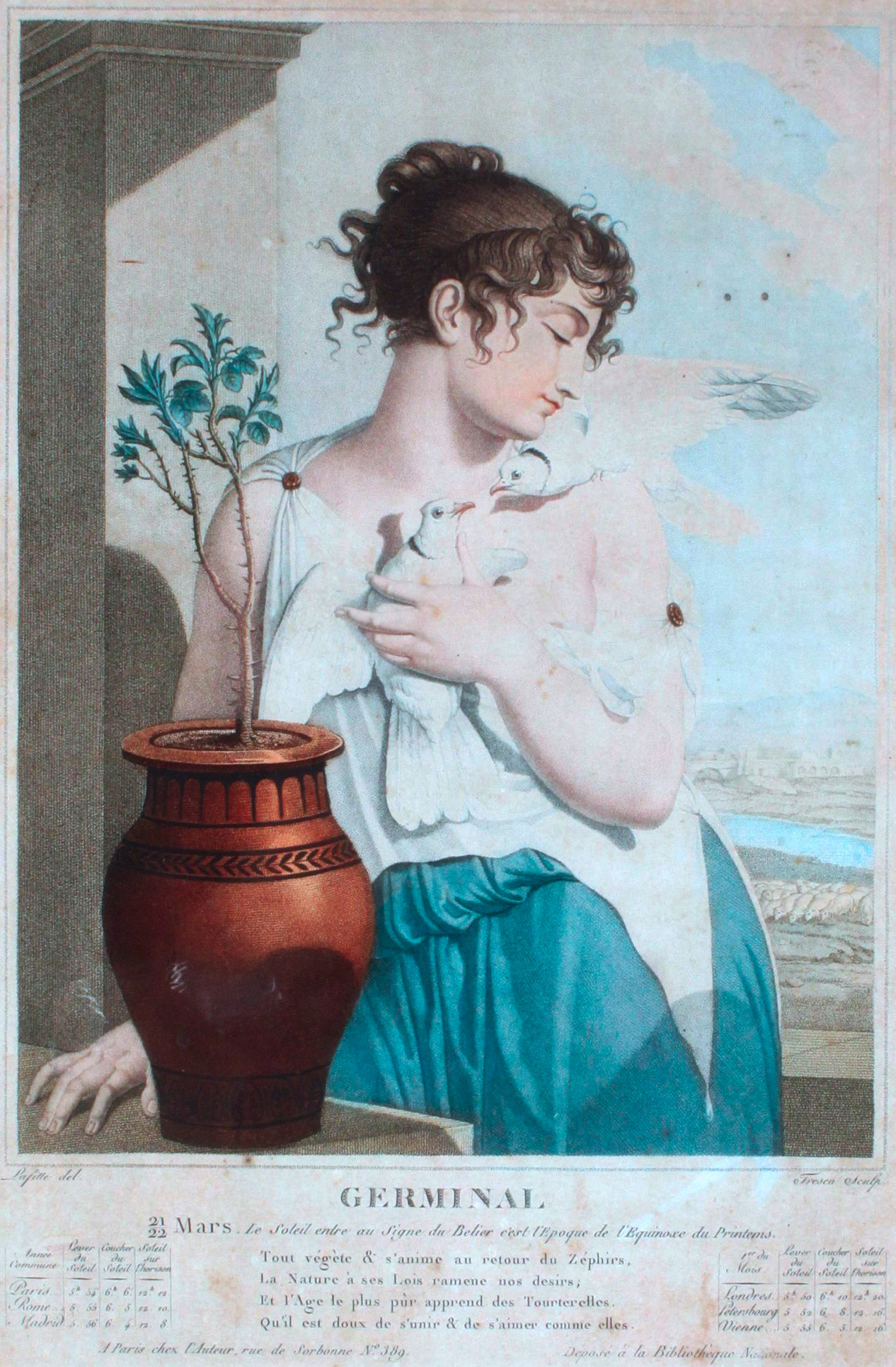
Germinal

01:23:59
Time of day - 24 h/day
Greenwich

Year: 8
Month: Germinal
Year: VIII

Day of the 10-day
week (décade)
Primidi
Duodi
Tridi
Quartidi
Quintidi
Sextidi
Septidi
Octidi
Nonidi
Décadi

décade 19
1	Saturday; 22 March 1800
2	Sunday; 23 March 1800
3	Monday; 24 March 1800
4	Tuesday; 25 March 1800
5	Wednesday; 26 March 1800
6	Thursday; 27 March 1800
7	Friday; 28 March 1800
8	Saturday; 29 March 1800
9	Sunday; 30 March 1800
10	Monday; 31 March 1800

décade 20
11	Tuesday; 1 April 1800
12	Wednesday; 2 April 1800
13	Thursday; 3 April 1800
14	Friday; 4 April 1800
15	Saturday; 5 April 1800
16	Sunday; 6 April 1800
17	Monday; 7 April 1800
18	Tuesday; 8 April 1800
19	Wednesday; 9 April 1800
20	Thursday; 10 April 1800

décade 21
21	Friday; 11 April 1800
22	Saturday; 12 April 1800
23	Sunday; 13 April 1800
24	Monday; 14 April 1800
25	Tuesday; 15 April 1800
26	Wednesday; 16 April 1800
27	Thursday; 17 April 1800
28	Friday; 18 April 1800
29	Saturday; 19 April 1800
30	Sunday; 20 April 1800

Decimal time – 10 h/day
Paris
0:58:32

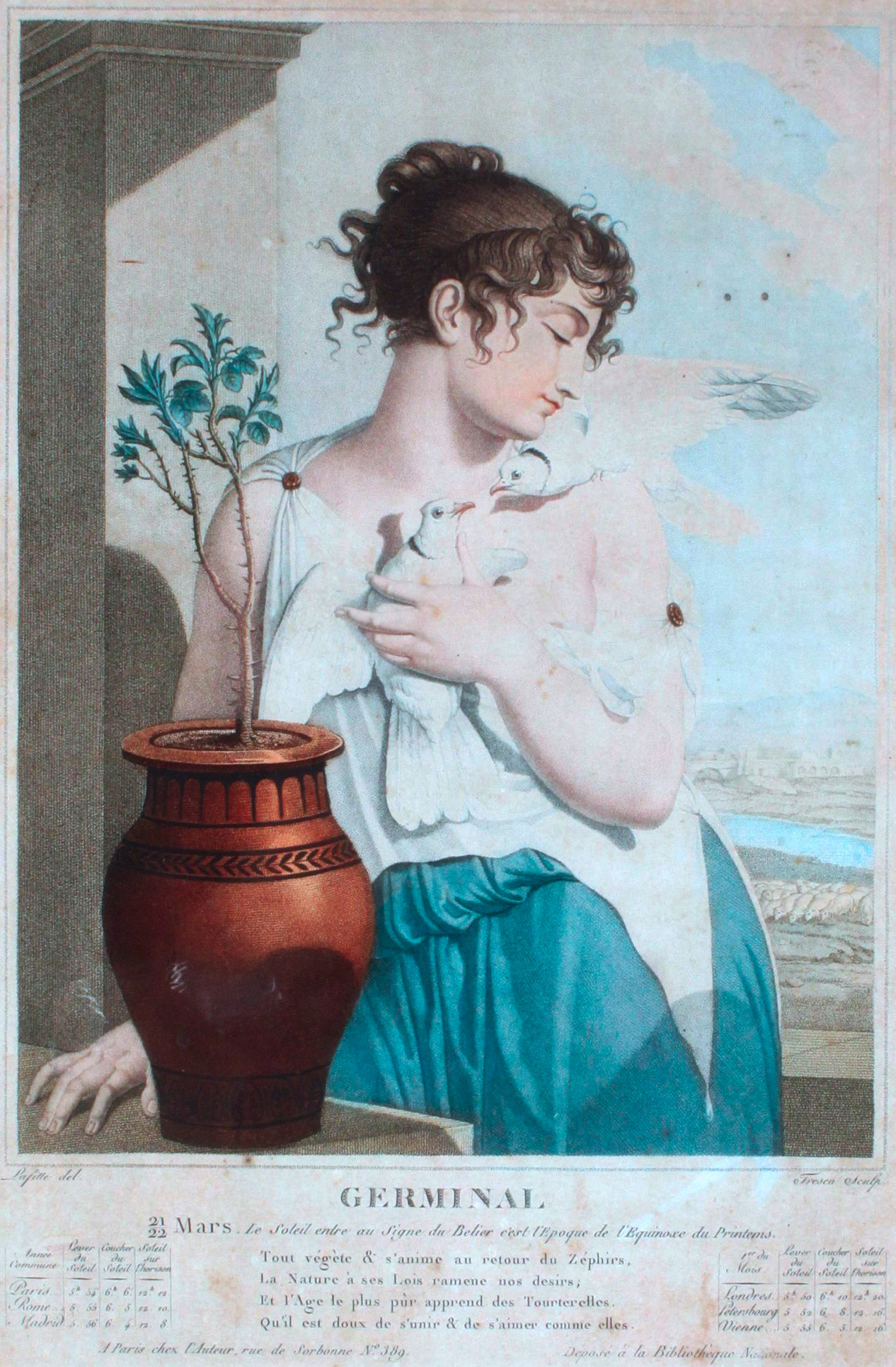
Germinal

01:23:59
Time of day - 24 h/day
Greenwich

Year: 9
Month: Germinal
Year: IX

Day of the 10-day
week (décade)
Primidi
Duodi
Tridi
Quartidi
Quintidi
Sextidi
Septidi
Octidi
Nonidi
Décadi

décade 19
1	Sunday; 22 March 1801
2	Monday; 23 March 1801
3	Tuesday; 24 March 1801
4	Wednesday; 25 March 1801
5	Thursday; 26 March 1801
6	Friday; 27 March 1801
7	Saturday; 28 March 1801
8	Sunday; 29 March 1801
9	Monday; 30 March 1801
10	Tuesday; 31 March 1801

décade 20
11	Wednesday; 1 April 1801
12	Thursday; 2 April 1801
13	Friday; 3 April 1801
14	Saturday; 4 April 1801
15	Sunday; 5 April 1801
16	Monday; 6 April 1801
17	Tuesday; 7 April 1801
18	Wednesday; 8 April 1801
19	Thursday; 9 April 1801
20	Friday; 10 April 1801

décade 21
21	Saturday; 11 April 1801
22	Sunday; 12 April 1801
23	Monday; 13 April 1801
24	Tuesday; 14 April 1801
25	Wednesday; 15 April 1801
26	Thursday; 16 April 1801
27	Friday; 17 April 1801
28	Saturday; 18 April 1801
29	Sunday; 19 April 1801
30	Monday; 20 April 1801

Decimal time – 10 h/day
Paris
0:58:32

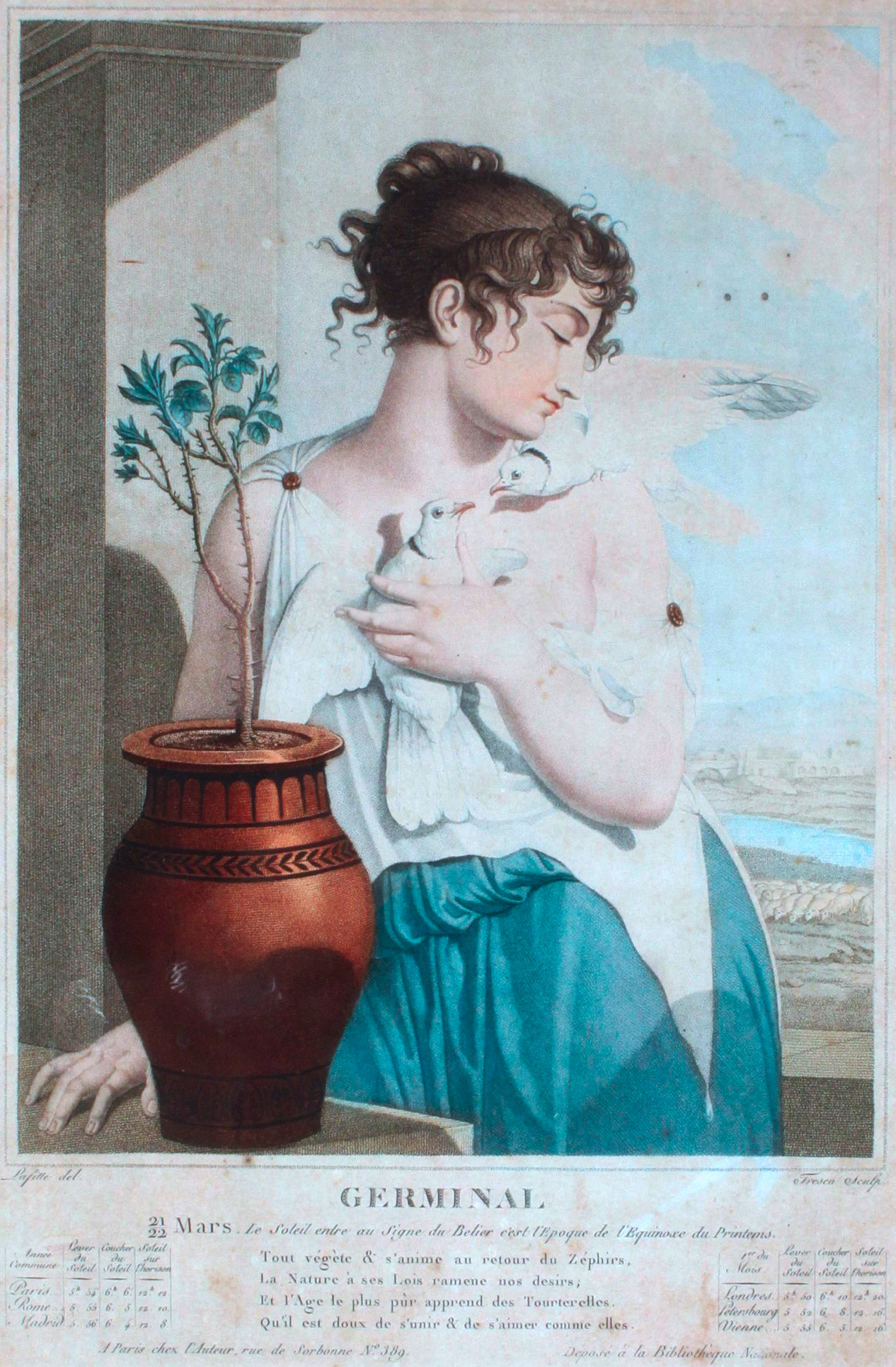
Germinal

01:23:59
Time of day - 24 h/day
Greenwich

Year: 10
Month: Germinal
Year: X

Day of the 10-day
week (décade)
Primidi
Duodi
Tridi
Quartidi
Quintidi
Sextidi
Septidi
Octidi
Nonidi
Décadi

décade 19
1	Monday; 22 March 1802
2	Tuesday; 23 March 1802
3	Wednesday; 24 March 1802
4	Thursday; 25 March 1802
5	Friday; 26 March 1802
6	Saturday; 27 March 1802
7	Sunday; 28 March 1802
8	Monday; 29 March 1802
9	Tuesday; 30 March 1802
10	Wednesday; 31 March 1802

décade 20
11	Thursday; 1 April 1802
12	Friday; 2 April 1802
13	Saturday; 3 April 1802
14	Sunday; 4 April 1802
15	Monday; 5 April 1802
16	Tuesday; 6 April 1802
17	Wednesday; 7 April 1802
18	Thursday; 8 April 1802
19	Friday; 9 April 1802
20	Saturday; 10 April 1802

décade 21
21	Sunday; 11 April 1802
22	Monday; 12 April 1802
23	Tuesday; 13 April 1802
24	Wednesday; 14 April 1802
25	Thursday; 15 April 1802
26	Friday; 16 April 1802
27	Saturday; 17 April 1802
28	Sunday; 18 April 1802
29	Monday; 19 April 1802
30	Tuesday; 20 April 1802

Decimal time – 10 h/day
Paris
0:58:32

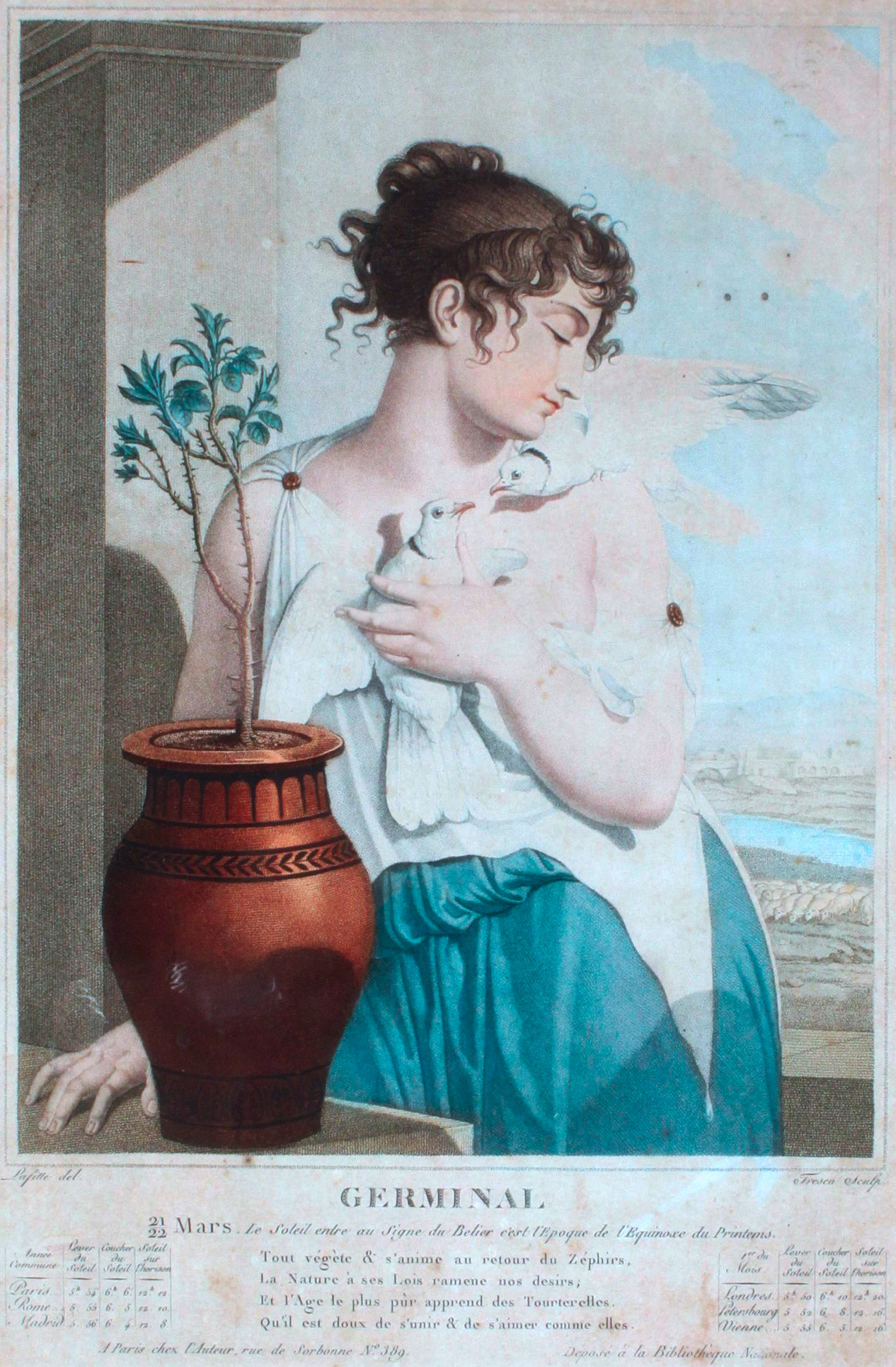
Germinal

01:23:59
Time of day - 24 h/day
Greenwich

Year: 11
Month: Germinal
Year: XI

Day of the 10-day
week (décade)
Primidi
Duodi
Tridi
Quartidi
Quintidi
Sextidi
Septidi
Octidi
Nonidi
Décadi

décade 19
1	Tuesday; 22 March 1803
2	Wednesday; 23 March 1803
3	Thursday; 24 March 1803
4	Friday; 25 March 1803
5	Saturday; 26 March 1803
6	Sunday; 27 March 1803
7	Monday; 28 March 1803
8	Tuesday; 29 March 1803
9	Wednesday; 30 March 1803
10	Thursday; 31 March 1803

décade 20
11	Friday; 1 April 1803
12	Saturday; 2 April 1803
13	Sunday; 3 April 1803
14	Monday; 4 April 1803
15	Tuesday; 5 April 1803
16	Wednesday; 6 April 1803
17	Thursday; 7 April 1803
18	Friday; 8 April 1803
19	Saturday; 9 April 1803
20	Sunday; 10 April 1803

décade 21
21	Monday; 11 April 1803
22	Tuesday; 12 April 1803
23	Wednesday; 13 April 1803
24	Thursday; 14 April 1803
25	Friday; 15 April 1803
26	Saturday; 16 April 1803
27	Sunday; 17 April 1803
28	Monday; 18 April 1803
29	Tuesday; 19 April 1803
30	Wednesday; 20 April 1803

Decimal time – 10 h/day
Paris
0:58:32

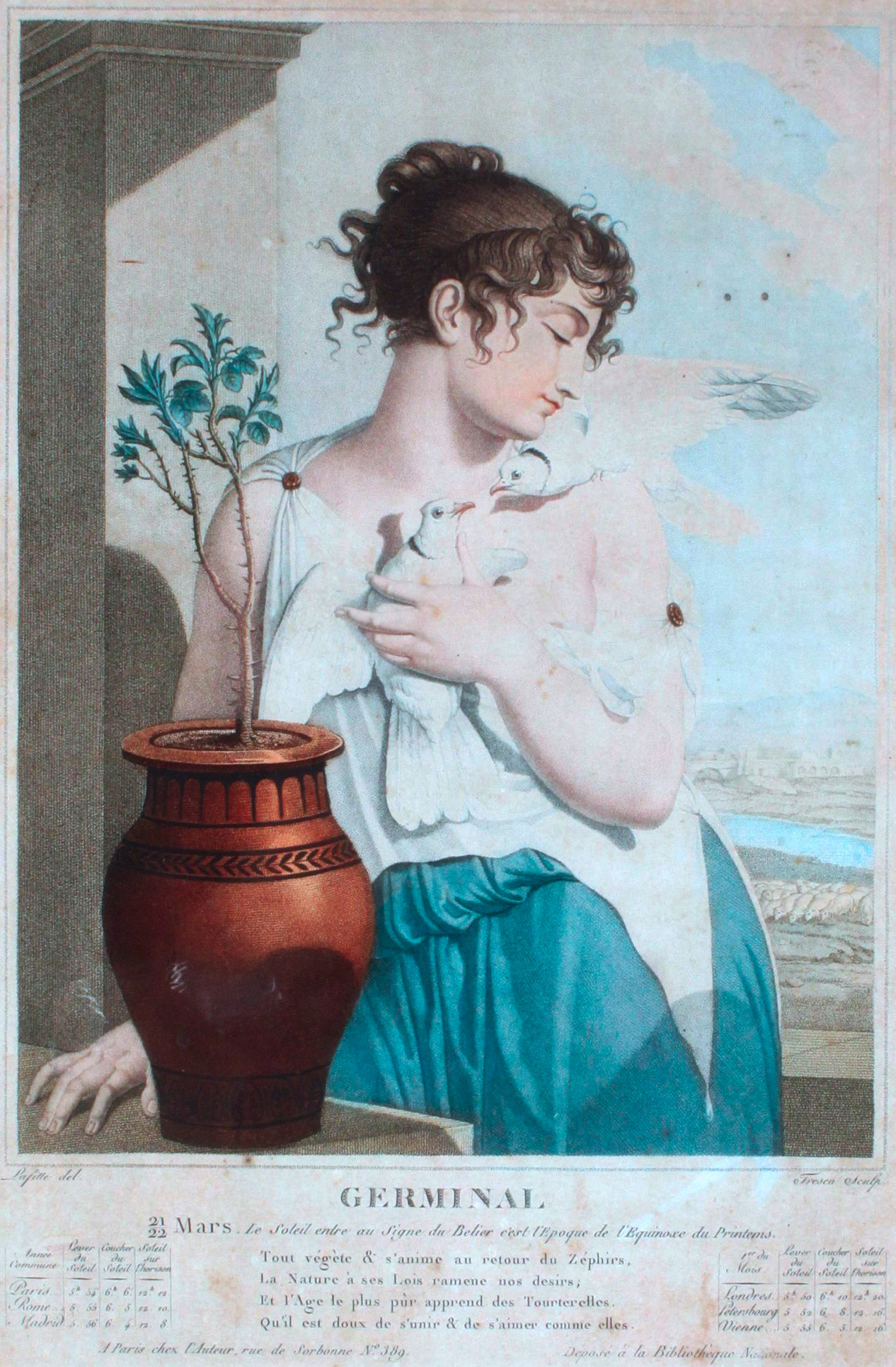
Germinal

01:23:59
Time of day - 24 h/day
Greenwich

Year: 12
Month: Germinal
Year: XII

Day of the 10-day
week (décade)
Primidi
Duodi
Tridi
Quartidi
Quintidi
Sextidi
Septidi
Octidi
Nonidi
Décadi

décade 19
1	Thursday; 22 March 1804
2	Friday; 23 March 1804
3	Saturday; 24 March 1804
4	Sunday; 25 March 1804
5	Monday; 26 March 1804
6	Tuesday; 27 March 1804
7	Wednesday; 28 March 1804
8	Thursday; 29 March 1804
9	Friday; 30 March 1804
10	Saturday; 31 March 1804

décade 20
11	Sunday; 1 April 1804
12	Monday; 2 April 1804
13	Tuesday; 3 April 1804
14	Wednesday; 4 April 1804
15	Thursday; 5 April 1804
16	Friday; 6 April 1804
17	Saturday; 7 April 1804
18	Sunday; 8 April 1804
19	Monday; 9 April 1804
20	Tuesday; 10 April 1804

décade 21
21	Wednesday; 11 April 1804
22	Thursday; 12 April 1804
23	Friday; 13 April 1804
24	Saturday; 14 April 1804
25	Sunday; 15 April 1804
26	Monday; 16 April 1804
27	Tuesday; 17 April 1804
28	Wednesday; 18 April 1804
29	Thursday; 19 April 1804
30	Friday; 20 April 1804

Decimal time – 10 h/day
Paris
0:58:32

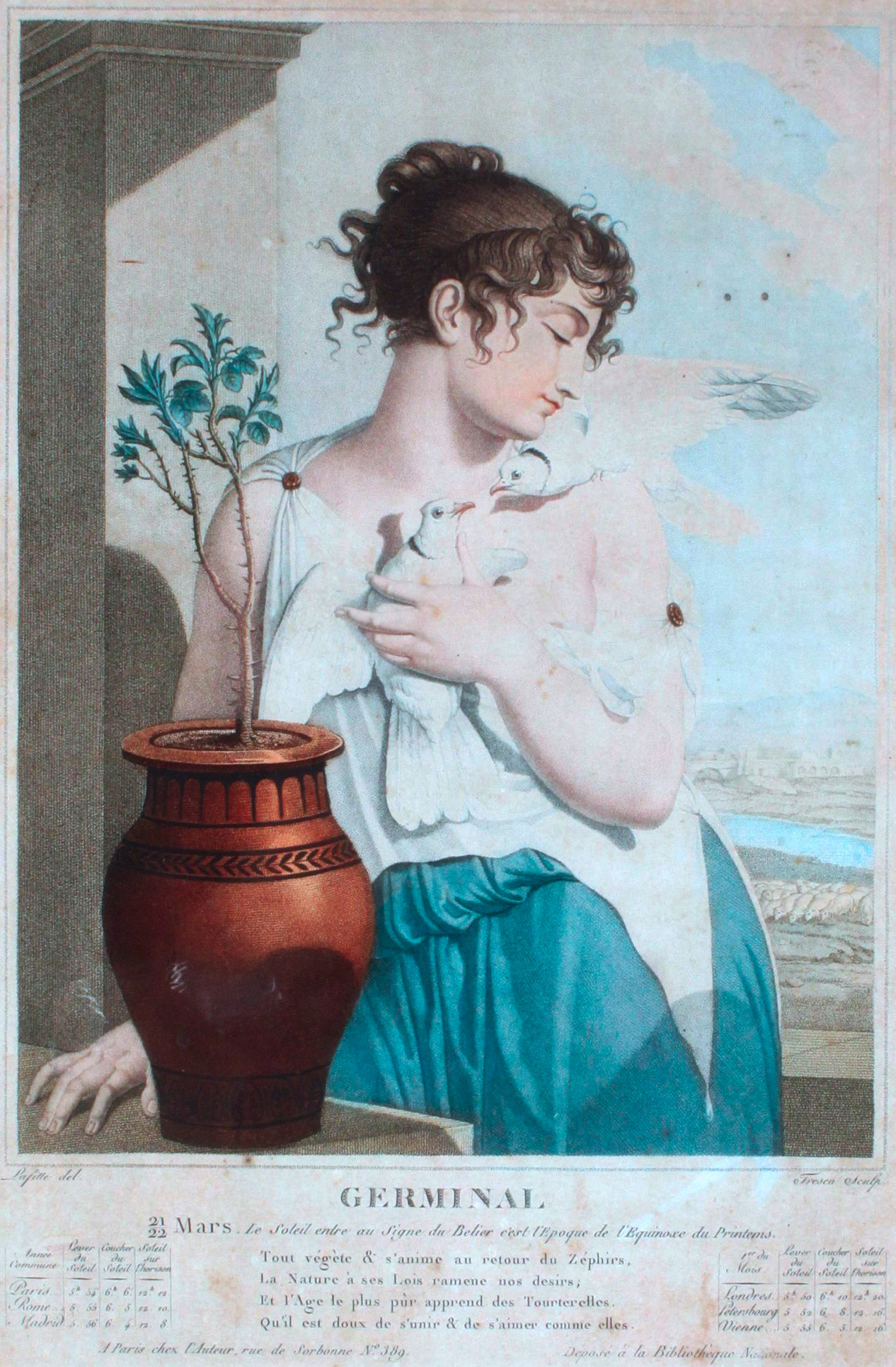
Germinal

01:23:59
Time of day - 24 h/day
Greenwich

Year: 13
Month: Germinal
Year: XIII

Day of the 10-day
week (décade)
Primidi
Duodi
Tridi
Quartidi
Quintidi
Sextidi
Septidi
Octidi
Nonidi
Décadi

décade 19
1	Friday; 22 March 1805
2	Saturday; 23 March 1805
3	Sunday; 24 March 1805
4	Monday; 25 March 1805
5	Tuesday; 26 March 1805
6	Wednesday; 27 March 1805
7	Thursday; 28 March 1805
8	Friday; 29 March 1805
9	Saturday; 30 March 1805
10	Sunday; 31 March 1805

décade 20
11	Monday; 1 April 1805
12	Tuesday; 2 April 1805
13	Wednesday; 3 April 1805
14	Thursday; 4 April 1805
15	Friday; 5 April 1805
16	Saturday; 6 April 1805
17	Sunday; 7 April 1805
18	Monday; 8 April 1805
19	Tuesday; 9 April 1805
20	Wednesday; 10 April 1805

décade 21
21	Thursday; 11 April 1805
22	Friday; 12 April 1805
23	Saturday; 13 April 1805
24	Sunday; 14 April 1805
25	Monday; 15 April 1805
26	Tuesday; 16 April 1805
27	Wednesday; 17 April 1805
28	Thursday; 18 April 1805
29	Friday; 19 April 1805
30	Saturday; 20 April 1805

Decimal time – 10 h/day
Paris
0:58:32

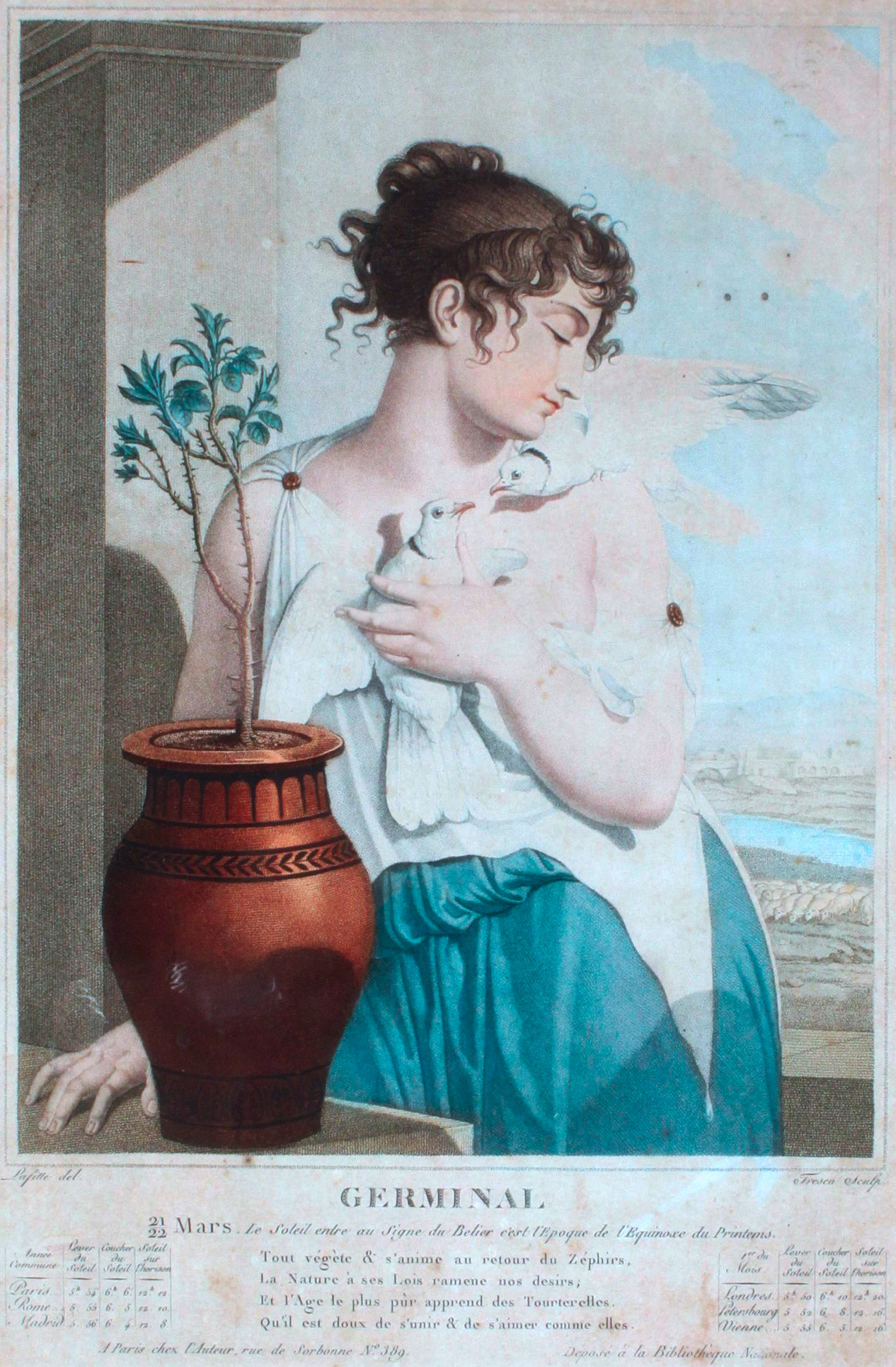
Germinal

01:23:59
Time of day - 24 h/day
Greenwich

Year: 14
Month: Germinal
Year: XIV

Day of the 10-day
week (décade)
Primidi
Duodi
Tridi
Quartidi
Quintidi
Sextidi
Septidi
Octidi
Nonidi
Décadi

décade 19
1	Saturday; 22 March 1806
2	Sunday; 23 March 1806
3	Monday; 24 March 1806
4	Tuesday; 25 March 1806
5	Wednesday; 26 March 1806
6	Thursday; 27 March 1806
7	Friday; 28 March 1806
8	Saturday; 29 March 1806
9	Sunday; 30 March 1806
10	Monday; 31 March 1806

décade 20
11	Tuesday; 1 April 1806
12	Wednesday; 2 April 1806
13	Thursday; 3 April 1806
14	Friday; 4 April 1806
15	Saturday; 5 April 1806
16	Sunday; 6 April 1806
17	Monday; 7 April 1806
18	Tuesday; 8 April 1806
19	Wednesday; 9 April 1806
20	Thursday; 10 April 1806

décade 21
21	Friday; 11 April 1806
22	Saturday; 12 April 1806
23	Sunday; 13 April 1806
24	Monday; 14 April 1806
25	Tuesday; 15 April 1806
26	Wednesday; 16 April 1806
27	Thursday; 17 April 1806
28	Friday; 18 April 1806
29	Saturday; 19 April 1806
30	Sunday; 20 April 1806

Decimal time – 10 h/day
Paris
0:58:32

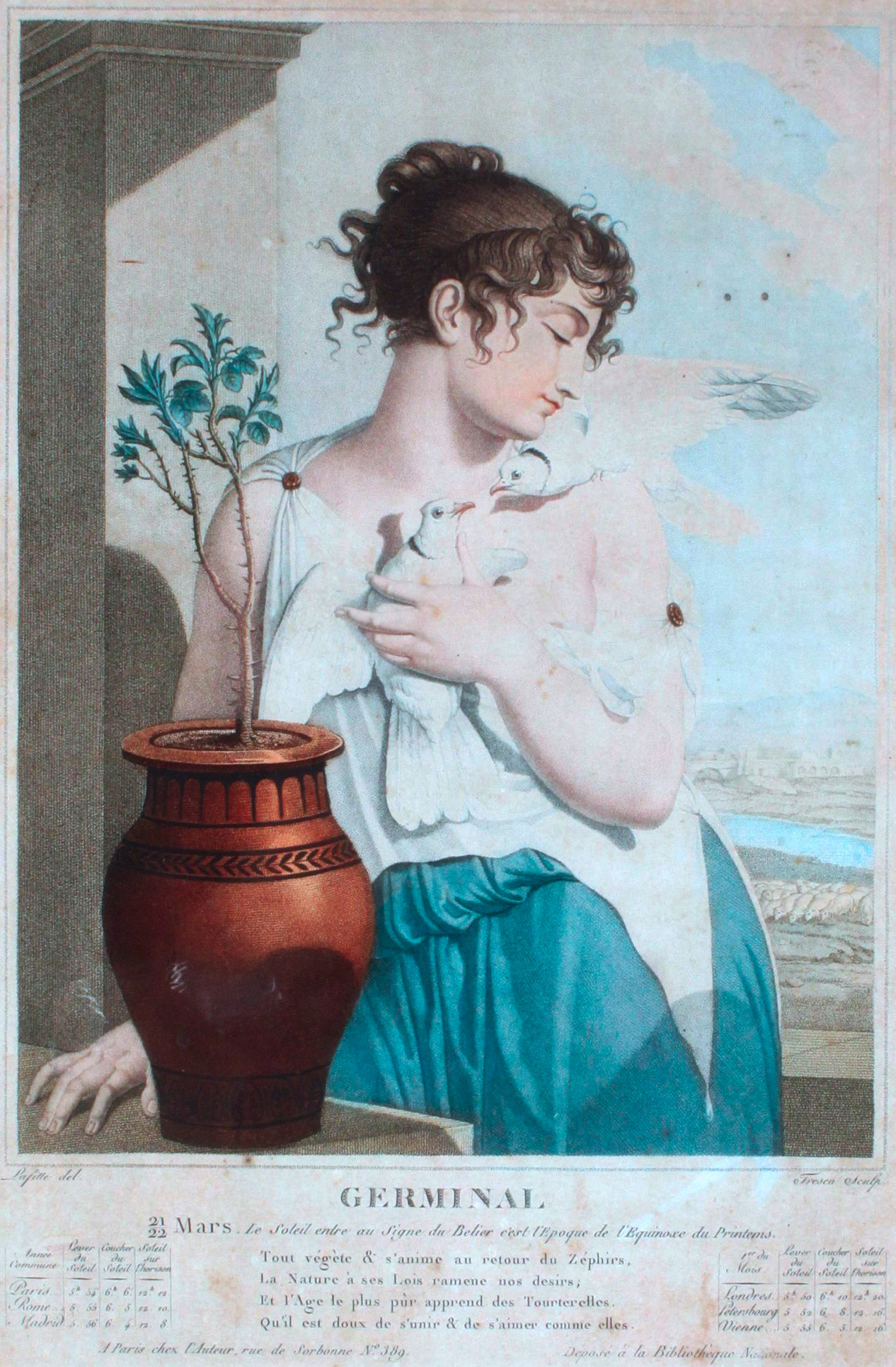
Germinal

01:23:59
Time of day - 24 h/day
Greenwich

== Day name table ==
Like all FRC months, Germinal lasted 30 days and was divided into three 10-day weeks called décades (decades). Every day had the name of an agricultural plant, except the 5th (Quintidi) and 10th day (Decadi) of every decade, which had the name of a domestic animal (Quintidi) or an agricultural tool (Decadi). The 26th and 27th changed their role in later years.

	1^{re} Décade		2^{e} Décade		3^{e} Décade
Primidi	1.	Primevère (Primrose)	11.	Pervenche (Periwinkle)	21.	Gainier (Judas tree)
Duodi	2.	Platane (Plane tree)	12.	Charme (Hornbeam)	22.	Romaine (Cos Lettuce)
Tridi	3.	Asperge (Asparagus)	13.	Morille (Round Morel)	23.	Maronnier (Horse Chestnut)
Quartidi	4.	Tulipe (Tulip)	14.	Hêtre (Beech)	24.	Roquette (Rocket)
Quintidi	5.	Poule (Hen)	15.	Abeille (Bee)	25.	Pigeon (Pigeon)
Sextidi	6.	Blette (Beetroot)	16.	Laitue (Lettuce)	26.	Anémone/Lilas (Anemone/Lilac)
Septidi	7.	Bouleau (Birch)	17.	Mélèze (Larch)	27.	Lilas/Anémone (Lilac/Anemone)
Octidi	8.	Jonquille (Jonquil)	18.	Ciguë (Hemlock)	28.	Pensée (Pansy)
Nonidi	9.	Aulne (Alder)	19.	Radis (Radish)	29.	Myrtil (Blueberry)
Decadi	10.	Couvoir (Hatchery)	20.	Ruche (Beehive)	30.	Greffoir (Graft Knife)

== Conversion table ==
Table for conversion between Republican and Gregorian Calendar
for the month "Germinal"

I. / II. / III. / IV. / V. / VI. / VII.
1	2	3	4	5	6	7	8	9	10	11	12	13	14	15	16	17	18	19	20	21	22	23	24	25	26	27	28	29	30
21	22	23	24	25	26	27	28	29	30	31	1	2	3	4	5	6	7	8	9	10	11	12	13	14	15	16	17	18	19
March / 1793 / 1794 / 1795 / 1796 / 1797 / 1798 / 1799 / April

VIII. / IX. / X. / XI. / XII. / XIII.
1	2	3	4	5	6	7	8	9	10	11	12	13	14	15	16	17	18	19	20	21	22	23	24	25	26	27	28	29	30
22	23	24	25	26	27	28	29	30	31	1	2	3	4	5	6	7	8	9	10	11	12	13	14	15	16	17	18	19	20
March / 1800 / 1801 / 1802 / 1803 / 1804 / 1805 / April

== See also ==
- Germinal, a novel by Émile Zola titled after the month
