= Biofouling =

Growth of marine organisms on surfaces

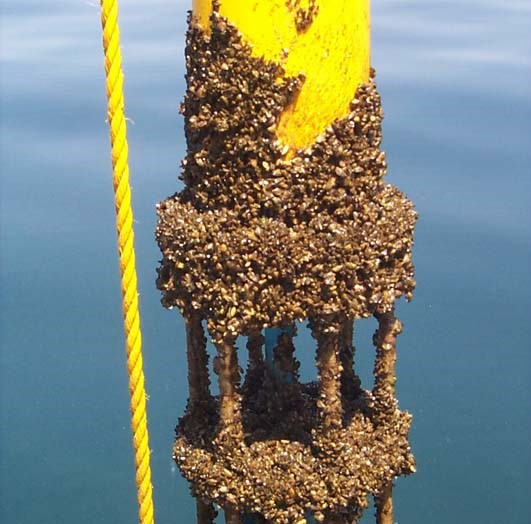
Current measurement instrument encrusted with zebra mussels

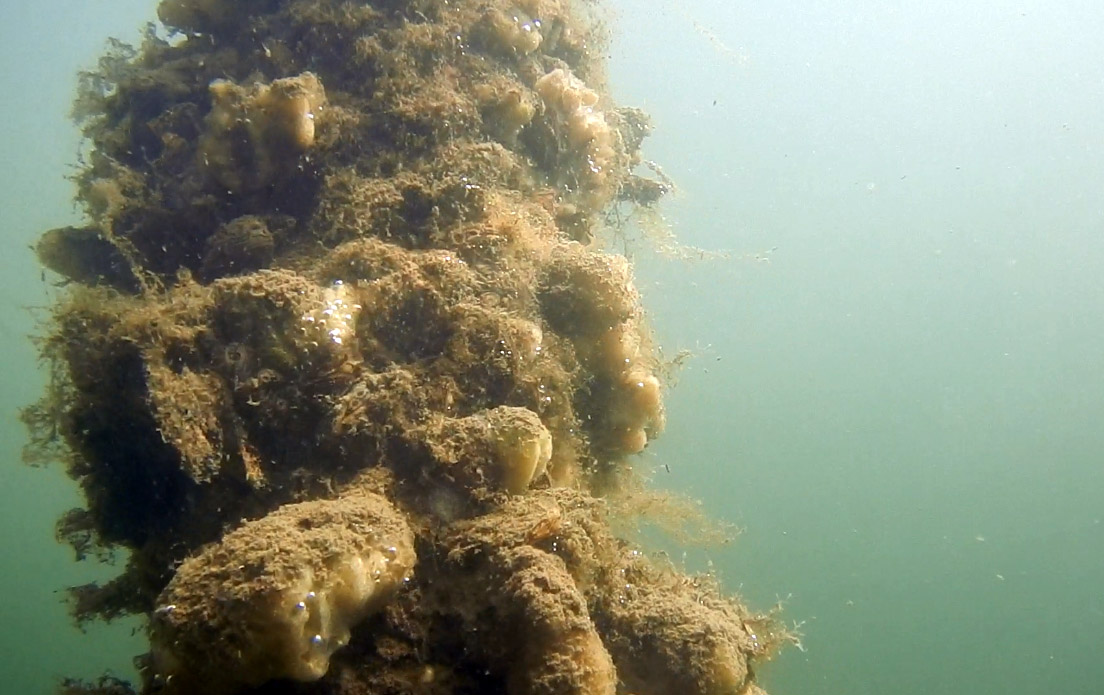
Plant organisms, bacteria and animals (freshwater sponges) have covered (fouled) the sheath of an electric cable in a canal (Mid-Deûle in Lille, north of France).

Biofouling or biological fouling is a phenomenon affecting human-made objects in the presence of water, wherein microorganisms, plants, algae, or small animals accumulate on the objects' surfaces and impede their functionality. Such accumulation is referred to as epibiosis when the host surface is another organism and the relationship is not parasitic. Since biofouling can occur almost anywhere water is present, it poses risks to a wide variety of objects, such as watercraft hulls and equipment, medical devices and membranes, as well as to entire industries, such as paper manufacturing, food processing, underwater construction, and desalination plants.

Anti-fouling is the ability of specifically designed materials (such as toxic biocide paints, or non-toxic paints) to remove or prevent biofouling.

The buildup of biofouling on marine vessels poses a significant problem. In some instances, the hull structure and propulsion systems can be damaged. The accumulation of biofoulers on hulls can increase both the hydrodynamic volume of a vessel and the hydrodynamic friction, leading to increased drag of up to 60%. The drag increase has been seen to decrease speeds by up to 10%, which can require up to a 40% increase in fuel to compensate. With fuel typically comprising up to half of marine transport costs, antifouling methods save the shipping industry a considerable amount of money. Further, increased fuel use due to biofouling contributes to adverse environmental effects and is predicted to increase emissions of carbon dioxide and sulfur dioxide between 38% and 72% by 2020, respectively.

== Biology ==
Biofouling organisms are highly diverse, and extend far beyond the attachment of barnacles and seaweeds. According to some estimates, over 1,700 species comprising over 4,000 organisms are responsible for biofouling. Biofouling is divided into microfouling—biofilm formation and bacterial adhesion—and macrofouling—attachment of larger organisms. Due to the distinct chemistry and biology that determine what prevents them from settling, organisms are also classified as hard- or soft-fouling types. Calcareous (hard) fouling organisms include barnacles, encrusting bryozoans, mollusks such as zebra mussels, and polychaete and other tube worms. Examples of non-calcareous (soft) fouling organisms are seaweed, hydroids, algae, and biofilm "slime". Together, these organisms form a fouling community.

=== Ecosystem formation ===
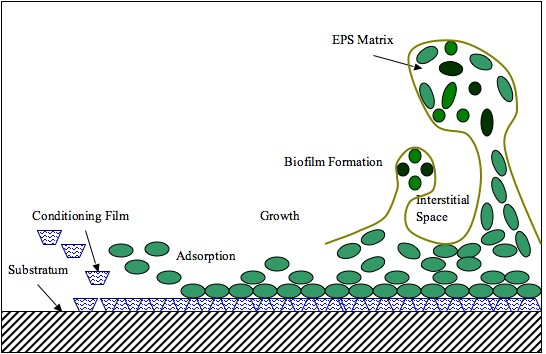
Biofouling initial process: (left) Coating of submerged "substratum" with polymers. (moving right) Bacterial attachment and extracellular polymeric substance (EPS) matrix formation.

Marine fouling is typically described as following four stages of ecosystem development. Within the first minute the van der Waals interaction causes the submerged surface to be covered with a conditioning film of organic polymers. In the next 24 hours, this layer allows the process of bacterial adhesion to occur, with both diatoms and bacteria (e.g. Vibrio alginolyticus, Pseudomonas putrefaciens) attaching, initiating the formation of a biofilm. By the end of the first week, the rich nutrients and ease of attachment into the biofilm allow secondary colonizers of spores of macroalgae (e.g. Enteromorpha intestinalis, Ulothrix) and sessile protozoans (e.g. Vorticella, Zoothamnium sp.) to attach themselves. Within two to three weeks, the tertiary colonizers—the macrofoulers—have attached. These include tunicates, mollusks, and sessile cnidarians.

== Impact ==
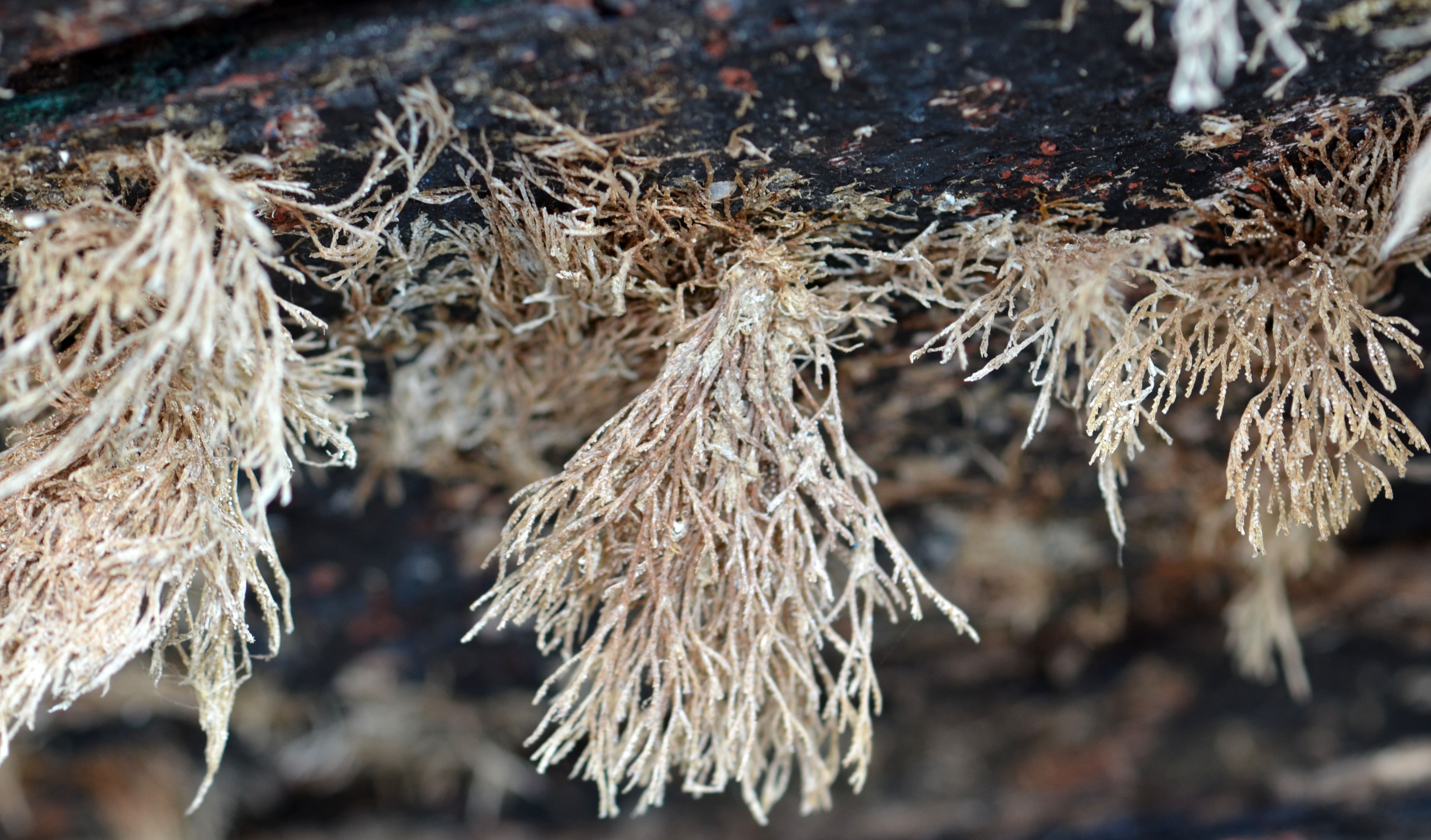
Dead biofouling, under a wood boat (detail)

Governments and industry spend more than US$5.7 billion annually to prevent and control marine biofouling. Biofouling occurs everywhere but is most significant economically to the shipping industries, since fouling on a ship's hull significantly increases drag, reducing the overall hydrodynamic performance of the vessel, and increases the fuel consumption.

Biofouling is also found in almost all circumstances where water-based liquids are in contact with other materials. Industrially important impacts are on the maintenance of mariculture, membrane systems (e.g., membrane bioreactors and reverse osmosis spiral wound membranes) and cooling water cycles of large industrial equipment and power stations. Biofouling can occur in oil pipelines carrying oils with entrained water, especially those carrying used oils, cutting oils, oils rendered water-soluble through emulsification, and hydraulic oils.

Other mechanisms impacted by biofouling include microelectrochemical drug delivery devices, papermaking and pulp industry machines, underwater instruments, fire protection system piping, and sprinkler system nozzles. In groundwater wells, biofouling buildup can limit recovery flow rates, as is the case in the exterior and interior of ocean-laying pipes where fouling is often removed with a tube cleaning process. Besides interfering with mechanisms, biofouling also occurs on the surfaces of living marine organisms, when it is known as epibiosis.

Medical devices often include fan-cooled heat sinks, to cool their electronic components. While these systems sometimes include HEPA filters to collect microbes, some pathogens do pass through these filters, collect inside the device and are eventually blown out and infect other patients. Devices used in operating rooms rarely include fans, so as to minimize the chance of transmission. Also, medical equipment, HVAC units, high-end computers, swimming pools, drinking-water systems and other products that utilize liquid lines run the risk of biofouling as biological growth occurs inside them.

Historically, the focus of attention has been the severe impact due to biofouling on the speed of marine vessels. In some instances the hull structure and propulsion systems can become damaged. Over time, the accumulation of biofoulers on hulls increases both the hydrodynamic volume of a vessel and the frictional effects leading to increased drag of up to 60% The additional drag can decrease speeds up to 10%, which can require up to a 40% increase in fuel to compensate. With fuel typically comprising up to half of marine transport costs, biofouling is estimated to cost the US Navy alone around $1 billion per year in increased fuel usage, maintenance and biofouling control measures. Increased fuel use due to biofouling contributes to adverse environmental effects and is predicted to increase emissions of carbon dioxide and sulfur dioxide between 38 and 72 percent by 2020.

Biofouling also impacts aquaculture, increasing production and management costs, while decreasing product value. Fouling communities may compete with shellfish directly for food resources, impede the procurement of food and oxygen by reducing water flow around shellfish, or interfere with the operational opening of their valves. Consequently, stock affected by biofouling can experience reduced growth, condition and survival, with subsequent negative impacts on farm productivity. Although many methods of removal exist, they often impact the cultured species, sometimes more so than the fouling organisms themselves.

In large river systems with heavy shipping traffic, biofouling on vessel hulls serves as a significant vector for aquatic invasions. Beyond the transport of organisms in ballast water or with construction materials (such as sand-gravel mixtures), the passive transfer of fish eggs attached to hull biofouling facilitates the spread of benthic and littoral fish species across interconnected river basins.

== Detection ==
Shipping companies have historically relied on scheduled biofouler removal to keep such accretions to a manageable level. However, the rate of accretion can vary widely between vessels and operating conditions, so predicting acceptable intervals between cleanings is difficult.

LED manufacturers have developed a range of UVC (250–280 nm) equipment that can detect biofouling buildup, and can even prevent it.

Fouling detection relies on the biomass' property of fluorescence. All microorganisms contain natural intracellular fluorophores, which radiate in the UV range when excited. At UV-range wavelengths, such fluorescence arises from three aromatic amino acids—tyrosine, phenylalanine, and tryptophan. The easiest to detect is tryptophan, which radiates at 350 nm when irradiated at 280 nm.

== Regulations and guidelines ==
In 2023, the International Maritime Organization (IMO) adopted 'Guidelines for the control and management of ships' biofouling to minimize the transfer of invasive aquatic species'.

In April 2025, the IMO agreed to develop a legally binding framework for controlling and managing ships’ biofouling to reduce the accumulation of marine organisms on the hulls of ships and thereby reduce the transfer of invasive aquatic species. Controlling ship's biofouling also improves the environmental efficiency of ships by reducing drag resistance.

== Prevention ==
=== Antifouling ===
Antifouling is the process of preventing accumulations from forming. In industrial processes, biodispersants can be used to control biofouling. In less controlled environments, organisms are killed or repelled with coatings using biocides, thermal treatments, or pulses of energy. Nontoxic mechanical strategies that prevent organisms from attaching include choosing a material or coating with a slippery surface, creating an ultra-low fouling surface with the use of zwitterions, or creating nanoscale surface topologies similar to the skin of sharks and dolphins, which only offer poor anchor points.

==== Coatings ====
===== Non-toxic coatings =====
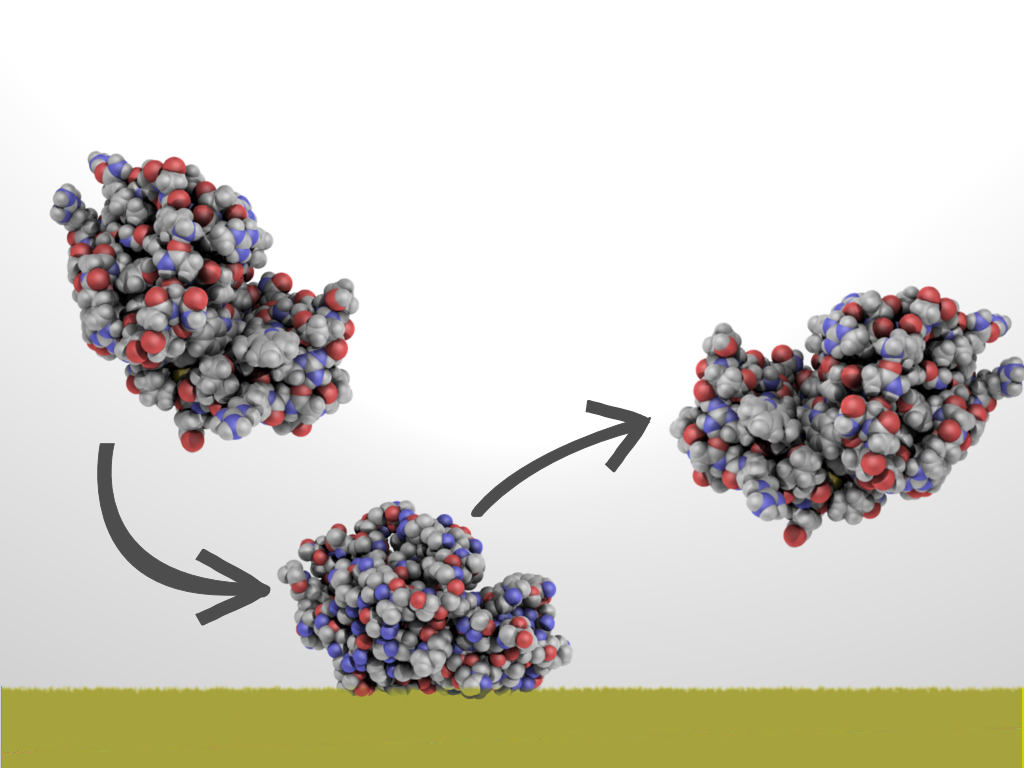
A general idea of non-toxic coatings. (Coating represented here as light pea green layer.) They prevent proteins and microorganisms from attaching, which prevents large organisms such as barnacles from attaching. Larger organisms require a biofilm to attach, which is composed of proteins, polysaccharides, and microorganisms.

Non-toxic anti-sticking coatings prevent attachment of microorganisms thus negating the use of biocides. These coatings are usually based on organic polymers.

There are two classes of non-toxic anti-fouling coatings. The most common class relies on low friction and low surface energies. Low surface energies result in hydrophobic surfaces. These coatings create a smooth surface, which can prevent attachment of larger microorganisms. For example, fluoropolymers and silicone coatings are commonly used. These coatings are ecologically inert but have problems with mechanical strength and long-term stability. Specifically, after days biofilms (slime) can coat the surfaces, which buries the chemical activity and allows microorganisms to attach. The current standard for these coatings is polydimethylsiloxane, or PDMS, which consists of a non-polar backbone made of repeating units of silicon and oxygen atoms. The non-polarity of PDMS allows for biomolecules to readily adsorb to its surface in order to lower interfacial energy. However, PDMS also has a low modulus of elasticity that allows for the release of fouling organisms at speeds of greater than 20 knots. The dependence of effectiveness on vessel speed prevents use of PDMS on slow-moving ships or those that spend significant amounts of time in port.

The second class of non-toxic antifouling coatings are hydrophilic coatings. They rely on high amounts of hydration in order to increase the energetic penalty of removing water for proteins and microorganisms to attach. The most common examples of these coatings are based on highly hydrated zwitterions, such as glycine betaine and sulfobetaine. These coatings are also low-friction, but are considered by some to be superior to hydrophobic surfaces because they prevent bacteria attachment, preventing biofilm formation. These coatings are not yet commercially available and are being designed as part of a larger effort by the Office of Naval Research to develop environmentally safe biomimetic ship coatings.

===== Biocides =====
Biocides are chemical substances that kill or deter microorganisms responsible for biofouling. The biocide is typically applied as a paint, i.e. through physical adsorption. The biocides prevent the formation of biofilms. Other biocides are toxic to larger organisms in biofouling, such as algae. Formerly, the so-called tributyltin (TBT) compounds were used as biocides (and thus anti-fouling agents). TBTs are toxic to both microorganisms and larger aquatic organisms. The international maritime community has phased out the use of organotin-based coatings. Replacing organotin compounds is dichlorooctylisothiazolinone. This compound, however, also suffers from broad toxicity to marine organisms.

==== Ultrasonic antifouling ====
Ultrasonic transducers may be mounted in or around the hull of small to medium-sized boats. Research has shown these systems can help reduce fouling, by initiating bursts of ultrasonic waves through the hull medium to the surrounding water, killing or denaturing the algae and other microorganisms that form the beginning of the fouling sequence. The systems cannot work on wooden-hulled boats, or boats with a soft-cored composite material, such as wood or foam. The systems have been loosely based on technology proven to control algae blooms.

==== Energy methods ====
Pulsed laser irradiation is commonly used against diatoms. Plasma pulse technology is effective against zebra mussels and works by stunning or killing the organisms with microsecond-duration energizing of the water with high-voltage electricity.

Similarly, another method shown to be effective against algae buildups bounces brief high-energy acoustic pulses down pipes.

==== Other methods ====
Regimens to periodically use heat to treat exchanger equipment and pipes have been successfully used to remove mussels from power plant cooling systems using water at 105 °F (40 °C) for 30 minutes.

The medical industry utilizes a variety of energy methods to address bioburden issues associated with biofouling. Autoclaving typically involves heating a medical device to 121 °C (249 °F) for 15–20 minutes. Ultrasonic cleaning, UV light, and chemical wipe-down or immersion can also be used for different types of devices.

Medical devices used in operating rooms, ICUs, isolation rooms, biological analysis labs, and other high-contamination-risk areas have negative pressure (constant exhaust) in the rooms, maintain strict cleaning protocols, require equipment with no fans, and often drape equipment in protective plastic.

UVC irradiation is a noncontact, nonchemical solution that can be used across a range of instruments. Radiation in the UVC range prevents biofilm formation by deactivating the DNA in bacteria, viruses, and other microbes. Preventing biofilm formation prevents larger organisms from attaching themselves to the instrument and eventually rendering it inoperable.

== History ==
Biofouling, especially of ships, has been a problem for as long as humans have been sailing the oceans.

The earliest attestations of attempts to counter fouling, and thus also the earliest attestation of knowledge of it, is the use of pitch and copper plating as anti-fouling solutions that were attributed to ancient seafaring nations, such as the Phoenicians and Carthaginians (1500–300 BC). Wax, tar and asphaltum have been used since early times. An Aramaic record dating from 412 BC tells of a ship's bottom being coated with a mixture of arsenic, oil and sulphur. In Deipnosophistae, Athenaeus described the anti-fouling efforts taken in the construction of the great ship of Hieron of Syracuse (died 467 BC).

A recorded explanation by Plutarch of the impact fouling had on ship speed goes as follows: "when weeds, ooze, and filth stick upon its sides, the stroke of the ship is more obtuse and weak; and the water, coming upon this clammy matter, doth not so easily part from it; and this is the reason why they usually calk their ships."

Before the 18th century, various anti-fouling techniques were used, with three main substances employed: "White stuff", a mixture of train oil (whale oil), rosin and sulfur; "Black stuff", a mixture of tar and pitch; and "Brown stuff", which was simply sulfur added to Black stuff. In many of these cases, the purpose of these treatments is ambiguous. There is dispute whether many of these treatments were actual anti-fouling techniques, or whether, when they were used in conjunction with lead and wood sheathing, they were simply intended to combat wood-boring shipworms.

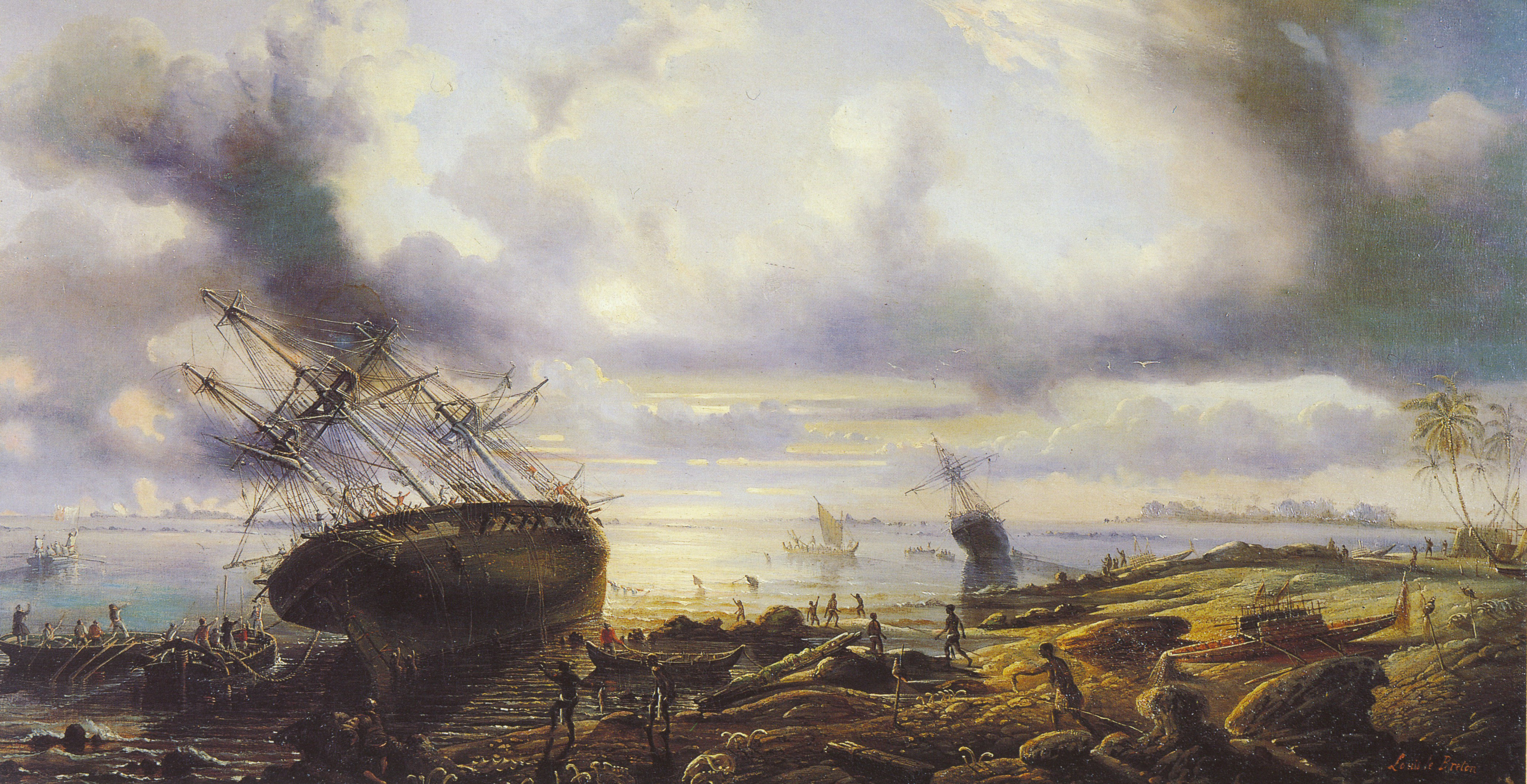
Ships brought ashore on the Torres Strait and careened in preparation for cleaning the hull

In 1708, Charles Perry suggested copper sheathing explicitly as an anti-fouling device but the first experiments were not made until 1761 with the sheathing of HMS Alarm, after which the bottoms and sides of several ships' keels and false keels were sheathed with copper plates.

The copper performed well in protecting the hull from invasion by worm, and in preventing the growth of weed, for when in contact with water, the copper produced a poisonous film, composed mainly of oxychloride, that deterred these marine creatures. Furthermore, as this film was slightly soluble, it gradually washed away, leaving no way for marine life to attach itself to the ship. From about 1770, the Royal Navy set about coppering the bottoms of the entire fleet and continued to the end of the use of wooden ships. The process was so successful that the term copper-bottomed came to mean something that was highly dependable or risk free.

With the rise of iron hulls in the 19th century, copper sheathing could no longer be used due to its galvanic corrosive interaction with iron. Anti-fouling paints were tried, and in 1860, the first practical paint to gain widespread use was introduced in Liverpool and was referred to as "McIness" hot plastic paint. These treatments had a short service life, were expensive, and relatively ineffective by modern standards.

By the mid-twentieth century, copper oxide-based paints could keep a ship out of drydock for as much as 18 months, or as little as 12 in tropical waters. The shorter service life was due to rapid leaching of the toxicant, and chemical conversion into less toxic salts, which accumulated as a crust that would inhibit further leaching of active cuprous oxide from the layer under the crust.

The 1960s brought a breakthrough, with self-polishing paints that slowly hydrolyze, slowly releasing toxins. These paints employed organotin chemistry ("tin-based") biotoxins such as tributyltin oxide (TBT) and were effective for up to four years. These biotoxins were subsequently banned by the International Maritime Organization when they were found to be very toxic to diverse organisms. TBT in particular has been described as the most toxic pollutant ever deliberately released in the ocean.

As an alternative to organotin toxins, there has been renewed interest in copper as the active agent in ablative or self polishing paints, with reported service lives up to 5 years; yet also other methods that do not involve coatings. Modern adhesives permit application of copper alloys to steel hulls without creating galvanic corrosion. However, copper alone is not impervious to diatom and algae fouling. Some studies indicate that copper may also present an unacceptable environmental impact.

Study of biofouling began in the early 19th century with Davy's experiments linking the effectiveness of copper to its solute rate. In the 1930s microbiologist Claude ZoBell showed that the attachment of organisms is preceded by the adsorption of organic compounds now referred to as extracellular polymeric substances.

One trend of research is the study of the relationship between wettability and anti-fouling effectiveness. Another trend is the study of living organisms as the inspiration for new functional materials. For example, the mechanisms used by marine animals to inhibit biofouling on their skin.

Materials research into superior antifouling surfaces for fluidized bed reactors suggest that low wettability plastics such as polyvinyl chloride (PVC), high-density polyethylene and polymethylmethacrylate ("plexiglas") demonstrate a high correlation between their resistance to bacterial adhesion and their hydrophobicity.

A study of the biotoxins used by organisms has revealed several effective compounds, some of which are more powerful than synthetic compounds. Bufalin, a bufotoxin, was found to be over 100 times as potent as TBT, and over 6,000 times more effective in anti-settlement activity against barnacles.

One approach to antifouling entails coating surfaces with polyethylene glycol (PEG). Growing chains of PEG on surfaces is challenging. The resolution to this problem may come from understanding the mechanisms by which mussels adhere to solid surfaces in marine environments. Mussels utilize adhesive proteins, or MAPs. The service life of PEG coatings is also doubtful.

== See also ==
- Fouling
- Biomimetic antifouling coatings
- Tributyltin
- Bottom paint
- Corrosion engineering
