= Biomimetic antifouling coating =

Coating preventing the accumulation of marine organisms

A biomimetic antifouling coating is a treatment that prevents the accumulation of marine organisms on a surface. Typical antifouling coatings are not biomimetic but are based on synthetic chemical compounds that can have deleterious effects on the environment. Prime examples are tributyltin compounds, which are components in paints to prevent biofouling of ship hulls. Although highly effective at combatting the accumulation of barnacles and other problematic organisms, organotin-containing paints are damaging to many organisms and have been shown to interrupt marine food chains.

Biomimetic antifouling coatings are highly lucrative because of their low environmental impact and demonstrated success. Some properties of a biomimetic antifouling coating can be predicted from the contact angles obtained from the Wenzel equation, and the calculated ERI. Natural materials such as shark skin continue to provide inspiration for scientists to improve the coatings currently on the market.

== Chemical methods ==
Most antifouling coatings are based upon chemical compounds that inhibit fouling. When incorporated into marine coatings, these biocides leach into the immediate surroundings and minimize fouling. The classic synthetic antifouling agent is tributyltin (TBT). Natural biocides typically show lower environmental impact but variable effectiveness.

The chemical structure of bufalin (3,4-dihydroxybufa-20,22 dienolide)

Natural biocides are found in a variety of sources, including sponges, algae, corals, sea urchins, bacteria, and sea-squirts, and include toxins, anaesthetics, and growth/attachment/metamorphosis-inhibiting molecules. As a group, marine microalgae alone produce over 3600 secondary metabolites that play complex ecological roles including defense from predators, as well as antifouling protection, increasing scientific interest in the screening of marine natural products as natural biocides. Natural biocides are typically divided into two categories: terpenes (often containing unsaturated ligand groups and electronegative oxygen functional groups) and nonterpenes.

The most effective natural biocide is 3,4-dihydroxybufa-20,22 dienolide, or bufalin (a steroid of toad poison from Bufo vulgaris), which is over 100 times more effective than TBT at preventing biofouling. Bufalin is however expensive. A few natural compounds with simpler synthetic routes, such as nicotinamide or 2,5,6-tribromo-1-methylgramine (from Zoobotryon pellucidum), have been incorporated into patented antifouling paints.

A significant drawback to biomimetic chemical agents is their modest service life. Since the natural biocides must leach out of the coating to be effective, the rate of leaching is a key parameter.

$\text{Total biocide release} = { L_\text{a} \times a \times W_\text{a} \times 100 \over\ SVR \times SPG \times DFT}$

Where L_{a} is the fraction of the biocide actually released (typically around 0.7), a is the weight fraction of the active ingredient in the biocide, DFT is the dry film thickness, W_{a} is the concentration of the natural biocide in the wet paint, SPG is the specific gravity of the wet paint, and SVR is the percentage of dry paint to wet paint by volume.

== Shark skin mimetics ==
One class of biomimetic antifouling coatings is inspired by the surface of shark skin, which consists of nanoscale overlapping placoid scales that exhibit parallel ridges that effectively prevent sharks from becoming fouled even when moving at slow speeds. The antifouling qualities of the shark skin-inspired designs appear highly dependent upon the engineered roughness index (ERI).

$ERI = { r \times n \over 1 - \phi}$

Where r is the Wenzel roughness ratio, n is the number of distinct surface features in the design of the surface, and φ is the area fraction of the tops of the distinct surface features. A completely smooth surface would have an ERI = 0.

Using this equation, the amount of microfouling spores per mm^{2} can be modeled. Similar to actual shark skin, the patterned nature of Sharklet AF shows microstructural differences in three dimensions with a corresponding ERI of 9.5. This three-dimensional patterned difference imparts a 77% reduction in microfouling settlement. Other artificial nonpatterned nanoscale rough surfaces such as 2-μm-diameter circular pillars (ERI = 5.0) or 2-μm-wide ridges (ERI = 6.1) reduce fouling settlement by 36% and 31%, respectively, while a more patterned surface composed of 2-μm-diameter circular pillars and 10-μm equilateral triangles (ERI = 8.7) reduces spore settlement by 58%. The contact angles obtained for hydrophobic surfaces are directly related to surface roughnesses by the Wenzel equation.

== See also ==
- Biofouling
- Fouling
- Anti-fouling
- Biomimicry
- Bionics
- Tributyltin (TBT)
- Sharklet
