= Muntz metal =

Type of brass

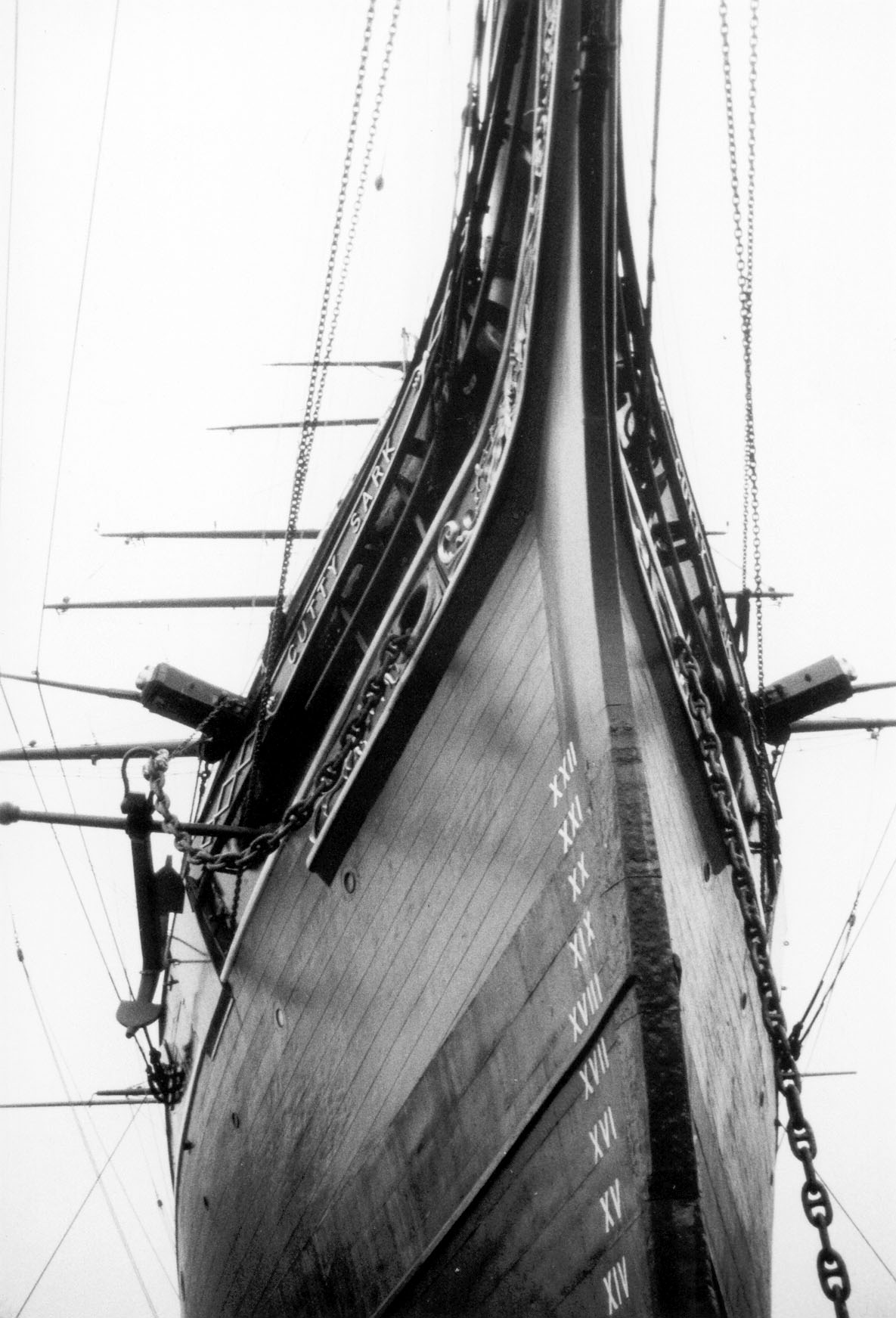
Bow of the Cutty Sark

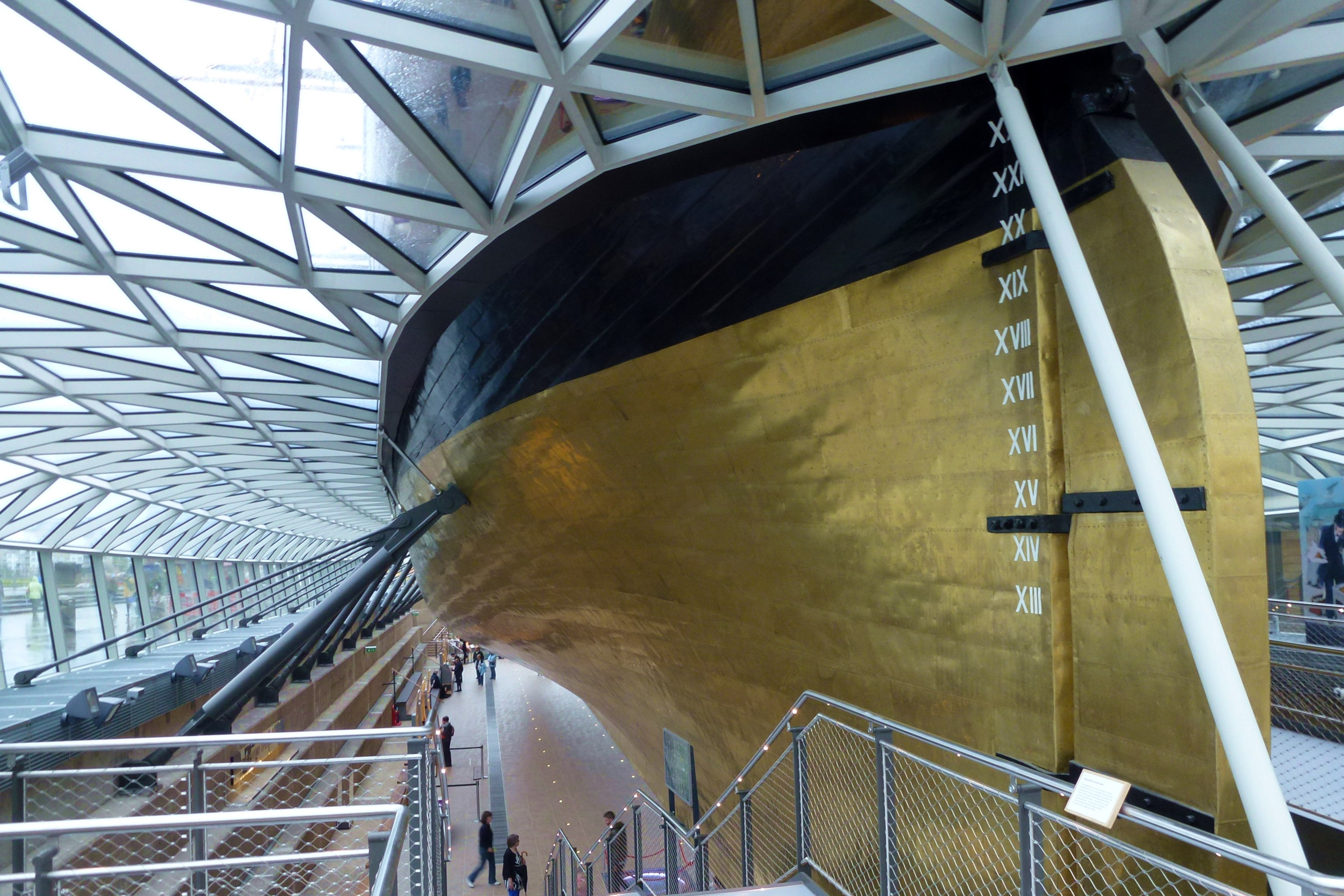
The restored stern of the Cutty Sark (with stern draft and rudder) sheathed in Muntz metal.

Muntz metal (also known as yellow metal) is an alpha-beta brass alloy composed of approximately 60% copper, 40% zinc and a trace of iron. It is named after George Fredrick Muntz, a metal-roller of Birmingham, England, who commercialised the alloy following his patent of 1832.

The alloy must be worked hot and is used today for corrosion-resistant machine parts. Alpha-beta (also called duplex) metals contain both the α and β phases. The α phase refers to a crystal structure that is face-centered cubic, while the β phase is body-centered cubic.

Its original application was as a replacement for copper sheathing on the bottom of boats, as it maintained the anti-fouling abilities of the pure copper at around two thirds of the price. It became the material of choice for this application and Muntz made his fortune. It was found that copper prevented any organism that attempted to attach itself to a hull sheathed in the metal. Thus, it was also used to sheathe the piles of piers in tropical seas, as a protection against teredo shipworms, and in locomotive tubes. After successful experimentation with the sheathing Muntz also took out a patent for bolts of the same composition. These too proved a success as they not only were cheaper but also very strong and lasted longer. A notable use of Muntz metal was in the hull of the Cutty Sark.

== Company history ==
Muntz's new metal contained more copper, less zinc, and a bit of iron not present in a similar 56:44 alloy patented by William Collins in 1800. Production began on Water Street, Birmingham, but moved to Swansea in 1837. In 1842 he bought the French Walls Works in Smethwick, formerly the site of James Watt Jr.'s ironworks. The 4.5-acre (18,000 m^{2}) site soon proved inadequate, and in 1850 a further 6.5 acres (26,000 m^{2}) were bought, on the other side of the Birmingham, Wolverhampton & Stour Valley Railway. Eventually, as the business outgrew Muntz's own rolling mill in Birmingham, he joined in partnership with Pascoe Grenfell and sons who produced it at their Swansea mill as Muntz's Patent Metal Company. They and other partners then fixed the prices of the alloy at £18 per ton lower than the market price for the equivalent copper product, serving to establish Muntz Metal as the sheathing of choice where transport costs still kept it as an efficient competitor. As an example of their success in entering the market, 50 ships were metalled with Muntz metal in 1837, over 100 in 1838, doubling in 1840 and doubling again by 1844.

With Muntz successfully supervising the manufacturing operations, by 1840 Muntz's Patent Metal Company employed 30 men to smelt and roll the alloy and was producing 2,000 tons yearly. Three years later the Company had over 200 men producing 3,000–4,000 tons yearly at £8 per ton profit. By then the Grenfells had left the partnership, for the agreement with Pascoe Grenfell & Sons had been terminated with some acrimony in 1842. When Muntz's patent expired in 1846, they and others began making fastenings and sheathing to the Muntz patent at will.

Muntz died in 1857, to be succeeded by his eldest son, also called George Fredrick, who sold the business in 1864 to a joint stock company, Muntz's Metal Co. Ltd. In 1921 the company was bought by Elliott's Metal Company, which became part of ICI's Imperial Metals division (now IMI plc) in 1928.

== See also ==
- Anti-fouling paint
