= Fouling =

Accumulation of unwanted material on solid surfaces

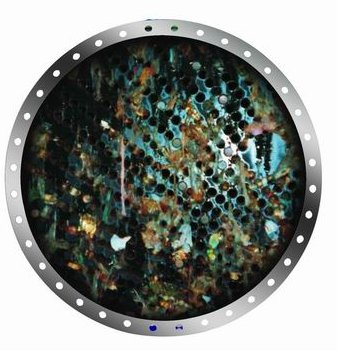
Fouling on a heat exchanger in a steam power plant

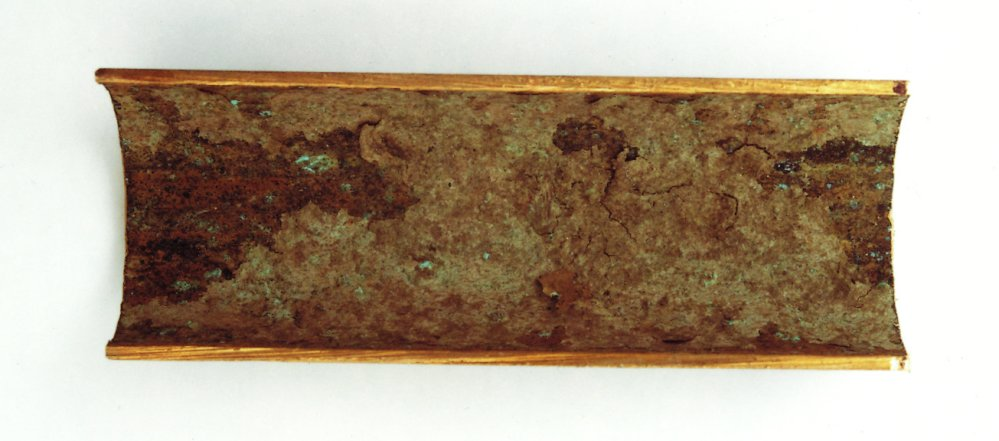
Condenser tube with residues of biofouling (cut open)

Fouling is the accumulation of unwanted material on solid surfaces. The fouling materials can consist of either living organisms (biofouling, organic) or a non-living substance (inorganic). Fouling is usually distinguished from other surface-growth phenomena in that it occurs on a surface of a component, system, or plant performing a defined and useful function and that the fouling process impedes or interferes with this function.

Other terms used in the literature to describe fouling include deposit formation, encrustation, crudding, deposition, scaling, scale formation, slagging, and sludge formation. The last six terms have a more narrow meaning than fouling within the scope of the fouling science and technology, and they also have meanings outside of this scope; therefore, they should be used with caution.

Fouling phenomena are common and diverse, ranging from fouling of ship hulls, natural surfaces in the marine environment (marine fouling), fouling of heat-transfer components through ingredients contained in cooling water or gases, and even the development of plaque or calculus on teeth or deposits on solar panels on Mars, among other examples.

This article is primarily devoted to the fouling of industrial heat exchangers, although the same theory is generally applicable to other varieties of fouling. In cooling technology and other technical fields, a distinction is made between macro fouling and micro fouling. Of the two, micro fouling is the one that is usually more difficult to prevent and therefore more important.

== Components subject to fouling ==
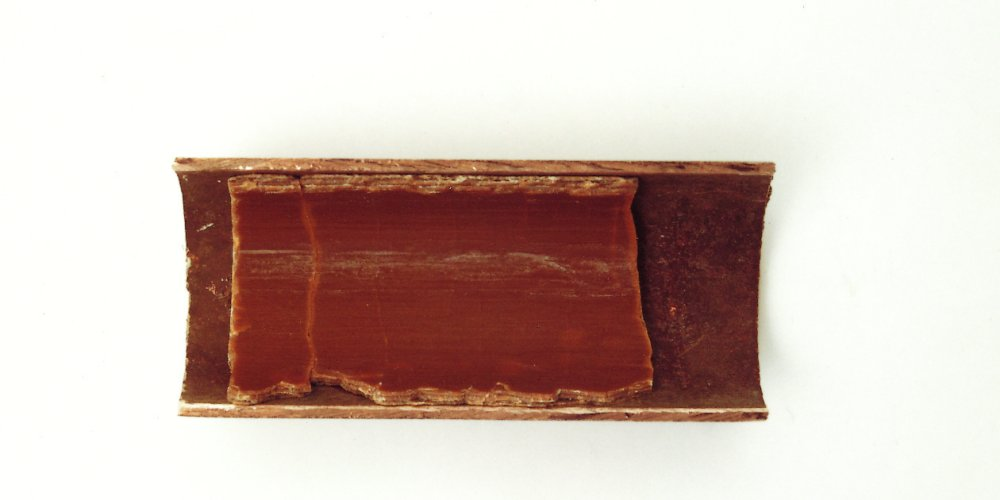
cross-section of a condenser tube with calcium carbonate scaling

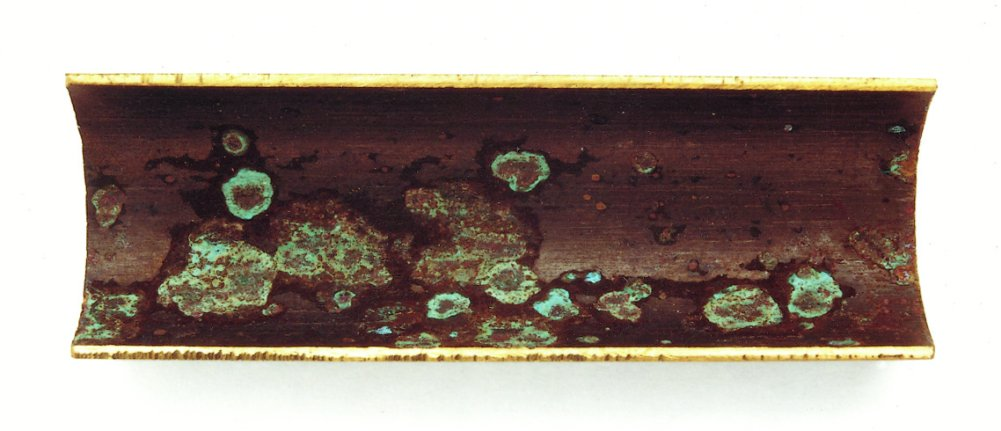
cross-section of a brass tube with corrosion traces

Examples of components that may be subject to fouling and the corresponding effects of fouling:

- Heat exchanger surfaces – reduces thermal efficiency, decreases heat flux, increases temperature on the hot side, decreases temperature on the cold side, induces under-deposit corrosion, increases use of cooling water;
- Piping, flow channels – reduces flow, increases pressure drop, increases upstream pressure, increases energy expenditure, may cause flow oscillations, slugging in two-phase flow, cavitation; may increase flow velocity elsewhere, may induce vibrations, may cause flow blockage;
- Ship hulls – creates additional drag, increases fuel usage, reduces maximum speed;
- Turbines – reduces efficiency, increases probability of failure;
- Solar panels – decreases the electrical power generated;
- Reverse osmosis membranes – increases pressure drop, increases energy expenditure, reduces flux, membrane failure (in severe cases);
- Electrical heating elements – increases temperature of the element, increases corrosion, reduces lifespan;
- Firearm barrels – increases chamber pressure; hampers loading for muzzleloaders
- Nuclear fuel in pressurized water reactors – axial offset anomaly, may need to de-rate the power plant;
- Injection/spray nozzles (e.g., a nozzle spraying a fuel into a furnace) – incorrect amount injected, malformed jet, component inefficiency, component failure;
- Venturi tubes, orifice plates – inaccurate or incorrect measurement of flow rate;
- Pitot tubes in airplanes – inaccurate or incorrect indication of airplane speed;
- Spark plug electrodes in cars – engine misfiring;
- Production zone of petroleum reservoirs and oil wells – decreased petroleum production with time; plugging; in some cases complete stoppage of flow in a matter of days;
- Teeth – promotes tooth or gum disease, decreases aesthetics;
- Living organisms – deposition of excess minerals (e.g., calcium, iron, copper) in tissues is (sometimes controversially) linked to aging/senescence.

== Macro fouling ==
Macro fouling is caused by coarse matter of either biological or inorganic origin, for example industrially produced refuse. Such matter enters into the cooling water circuit through the cooling water pumps from sources like the open sea, rivers or lakes. In closed circuits, like cooling towers, the ingress of macro fouling into the cooling tower basin is possible through open canals or by the wind. Sometimes, parts of the cooling tower internals detach themselves and are carried into the cooling water circuit. Such substances can foul the surfaces of heat exchangers and may cause deterioration of the relevant heat transfer coefficient. They may also create flow blockages, redistribute the flow inside the components, or cause fretting damage.

Examples

- Manmade refuse;
- Detached internal parts of components;
- Tools and other "foreign objects" accidentally left after maintenance;
- Algae;
- Mussels;
- Leaves, parts of plants up to entire trunks.

== Micro fouling ==
As to micro fouling, distinctions are made between:

- Scaling or precipitation fouling, as crystallization of solid salts, oxides, and hydroxides from water solutions (e.g., calcium carbonate or calcium sulfate)
- Particulate fouling, i.e., accumulation of particles, typically colloidal particles, on a surface
- Corrosion fouling, i.e., in-situ growth of corrosion deposits, for example, magnetite on carbon steel surfaces
- Chemical reaction fouling, for example, decomposition or polymerization of organic matter on heating surfaces
- Solidification fouling – when components of the flowing fluid with a high-melting point freeze onto a subcooled surface
- Biofouling, like settlements of bacteria and algae
- Composite fouling, whereby fouling involves more than one foulant or fouling mechanism

=== Precipitation fouling ===
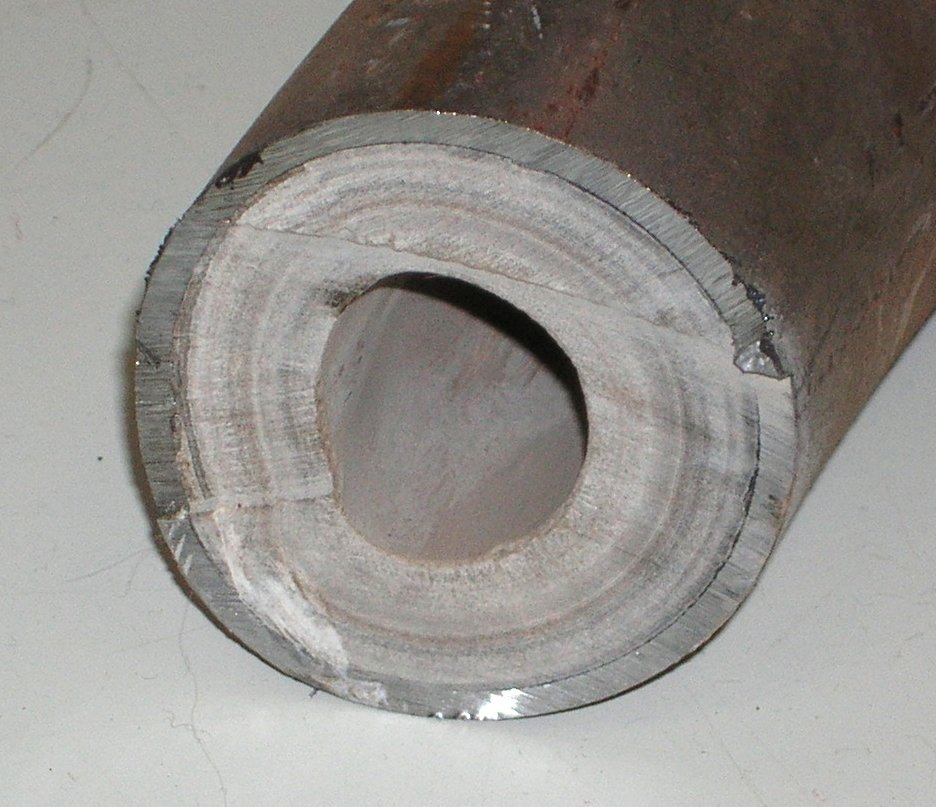
Limescale buildup inside a pipe reduces liquid flow through the pipe and reduces thermal conduction from the liquid to the outer pipe shell. Both effects will reduce the pipe's overall thermal efficiency when used as a heat exchanger.

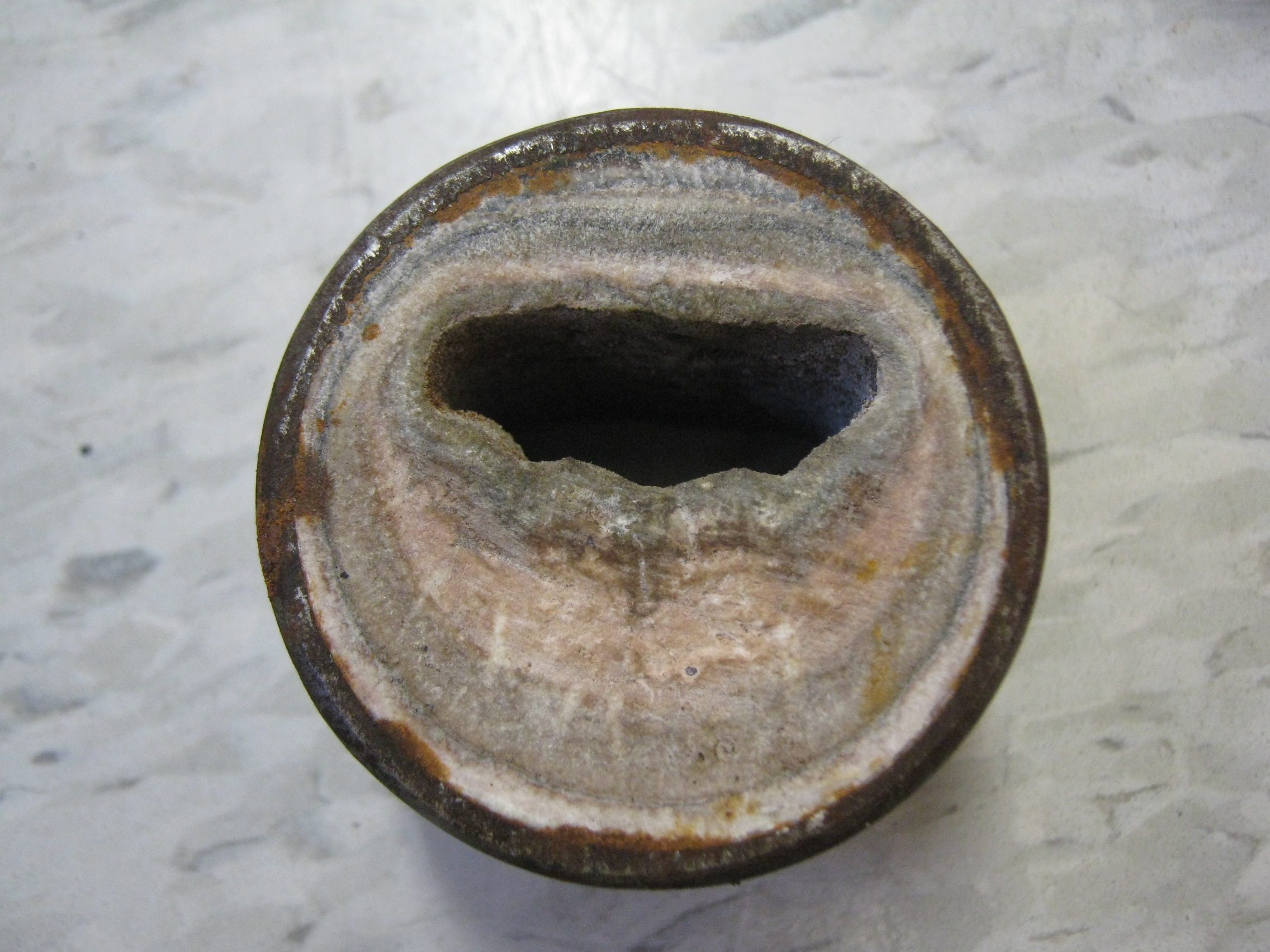
Extreme boiler pipe scale buildup

Temperature dependence of the solubility of calcium sulfate (3 phases) in pure water. The water is pressurized so that it can be maintained in the liquid state at the elevated temperatures.

Scaling or precipitation fouling involves crystallization of solid salts, oxides, and hydroxides from solutions. These are most often water solutions, but non-aqueous precipitation fouling is also known. Precipitation fouling is a very common problem in boilers and heat exchangers operating with hard water and often results in limescale.

Through changes in temperature, or solvent evaporation or degasification, the concentration of salts may exceed the saturation, leading to a precipitation of solids (usually crystals).

As an example, the equilibrium between the readily soluble calcium bicarbonate - always prevailing in natural water - and the poorly soluble calcium carbonate, the following chemical equation may be written:

$$\ce{\mathsf{{Ca(HCO3)2}_{(aqueous)} -> {CaCO3(v)} + {CO2}\!{\uparrow} + H2O}}$$

The calcium carbonate that forms through this reaction precipitates. Due to the temperature dependence of the reaction, and increasing volatility of CO_{2} with increasing temperature, the scaling is higher at the hotter outlet of the heat exchanger than at the cooler inlet.

In general, the dependence of the salt solubility on temperature or presence of evaporation will often be the driving force for precipitation fouling. The important distinction is between salts with "normal" or "retrograde" dependence of solubility on temperature. Salts with the "normal" solubility increase their solubility with increasing temperature and thus will foul the cooling surfaces. Salts with "inverse" or "retrograde" solubility will foul the heating surfaces. An example of the temperature dependence of solubility is shown in the figure. Calcium sulfate is a common precipitation foulant of heating surfaces due to its retrograde solubility.

Precipitation fouling can also occur in the absence of heating or vaporization. For example, calcium sulfate decreases its solubility with decreasing pressure. This can lead to precipitation fouling of reservoirs and wells in oil fields, decreasing their productivity with time. Fouling of membranes in reverse osmosis systems can occur due to differential solubility of barium sulfate in solutions of different ionic strength. Similarly, precipitation fouling can occur because of solubility changes induced by other factors, e.g., liquid flashing, liquid degassing, redox potential changes, or mixing of incompatible fluid streams.

The following lists some of the industrially common phases of precipitation fouling deposits observed in practice to form from aqueous solutions:

- Calcium carbonate (calcite, aragonite usually at t > ~50 °C, or rarely vaterite);
- Calcium sulfate (anhydrite, hemihydrate, gypsum);
- Calcium oxalate (e.g., beerstone);
- Barium sulfate (barite);
- Magnesium hydroxide (brucite); magnesium oxide (periclase);
- Silicates (serpentine, acmite, gyrolite, gehlenite, amorphous silica, quartz, cristobalite, pectolite, xonotlite);
- Aluminium oxide hydroxides (boehmite, gibbsite, diaspore, corundum);
- Aluminosilicates (analcite, cancrinite, noselite);
- Copper (metallic copper, cuprite, tenorite);
- Phosphates (hydroxyapatite);
- Magnetite or nickel ferrite (NiFe_{2}O_{4}) from extremely pure, low-iron water.

The deposition rate by precipitation is often described by the following equations:

Transport: $\frac {dm} {dt} = k_t (C_b-C_i)$
Surface crystallisation: $\frac {dm} {dt} = {k_r} (C_i-C_e)^{n_1}$
Overall: $\frac {dm} {dt} = k_d (C_b-C_e)^{n_2}$

where:

$m$ – mass of the material (per unit surface area), kg/m^{2}
$t$ – time, s
$C_b$ – concentration of the substance in the bulk of the fluid, kg/m^{3}
$C_i$ – concentration of the substance at the interface, kg/m^{3}
$C_e$ – equilibrium concentration of the substance at the conditions of the interface, kg/m^{3}
$n_1, n_2$ – order of reaction for the crystallization reaction and the overall deposition process, respectively, dimensionless
$k_t, k_r, k_d$ – kinetic rate constants for the transport, the surface reaction, and the overall deposition reaction, respectively; with the dimension of m/s (when $n_1 = n_2 = 1$)

=== Particulate fouling ===
Fouling by particles suspended in water ("crud") or in gas progresses by a mechanism different than precipitation fouling. This process is usually most important for colloidal particles, i.e., particles smaller than about 1 μm in at least one dimension (but which are much larger than atomic dimensions). Particles are transported to the surface by a number of mechanisms and there they can attach themselves, e.g., by flocculation or coagulation. Note that the attachment of colloidal particles typically involves electrical forces and thus the particle behaviour defies the experience from the macroscopic world. The probability of attachment is sometimes referred to as "sticking probability", $P$:

$$k_d = P k_t$$

where $k_d$ and $k_t$ are the kinetic rate constants for deposition and transport, respectively. The value of $P$ for colloidal particles is a function of both the surface chemistry, geometry, and the local thermohydraulic conditions.

An alternative to using the sticking probability is to use a kinetic attachment rate constant, assuming the first order reaction:

$$\frac {dm} {dt} = {k_a} C_i$$

and then the transport and attachment kinetic coefficients are combined as two processes occurring in series:

$$k_d = \left( \frac 1 {k_a} + \frac 1 {k_t} \right) ^{-1}$$
$$\frac {dm} {dt} = {k_d} C_b$$

where:

- $\frac{dm}{dt}$ is the rate of the deposition by particles, kg m^{−2} s^{−1},
- $k_a, k_t, k_d$ are the kinetic rate constants for deposition, m/s,
- $C_i$ and $C_b$ are the concentration of the particle foulant at the interface and in the bulk fluid, respectively; kg m^{−3}.

Being essentially a surface chemistry phenomenon, this fouling mechanism can be very sensitive to factors that affect colloidal stability, e.g., zeta potential. A maximum fouling rate is usually observed when the fouling particles and the substrate exhibit opposite electrical charge, or near the point of zero charge of either of them.

Particles larger than those of colloidal dimensions may also foul e.g., by sedimentation ("sedimentation fouling") or straining in small-size openings.

With time, the resulting surface deposit may harden through processes collectively known as "deposit consolidation" or, colloquially, "aging".

The common particulate fouling deposits formed from aqueous suspensions include:

- iron oxides and iron oxyhydroxides (magnetite, hematite, lepidocrocite, maghemite, goethite);
- Sedimentation fouling by silt and other relatively coarse suspended matter.

Fouling by particles from gas aerosols is also of industrial significance. The particles can be either solid or liquid. The common examples can be fouling by flue gases, or fouling of air-cooled components by dust in air. The mechanisms are discussed in article on aerosol deposition.

=== Corrosion fouling ===
Corrosion deposits are created in-situ by the corrosion of the substrate. They are distinguished from fouling deposits, which form from material originating ex-situ. Corrosion deposits should not be confused with fouling deposits formed by ex-situ generated corrosion products. Corrosion deposits will normally have composition related to the composition of the substrate. Also, the geometry of the metal-oxide and oxide-fluid interfaces may allow practical distinction between the corrosion and fouling deposits. An example of corrosion fouling can be formation of an iron oxide or oxyhydroxide deposit from corrosion of the carbon steel underneath. Corrosion fouling should not be confused with fouling corrosion, i.e., any of the types of corrosion that may be induced by fouling.

=== Chemical reaction fouling ===
Chemical reactions may occur on contact of the chemical species in the process fluid with heat transfer surfaces. In such cases, the metallic surface sometimes acts as a catalyst. For example, corrosion and polymerization occurs in cooling water for the chemical industry which has a minor content of hydrocarbons. Systems in petroleum processing are prone to polymerization of olefins or deposition of heavy fractions (asphaltenes, waxes, etc.). High tube wall temperatures may lead to carbonizing of organic matter. The food industry, for example milk processing, also experiences fouling problems by chemical reactions.

Fouling through an ionic reaction with an evolution of an inorganic solid is commonly classified as precipitation fouling (not chemical reaction fouling).

=== Solidification fouling ===
Solidification fouling occurs when a component of the flowing fluid "freezes" onto a surface forming a solid fouling deposit. Examples may include solidification of wax (with a high melting point) from a hydrocarbon solution, or of molten ash (carried in a furnace exhaust gas) onto a heat exchanger surface. The surface needs to have a temperature below a certain threshold; therefore, it is said to be subcooled in respect to the solidification point of the foulant.

=== Biofouling ===
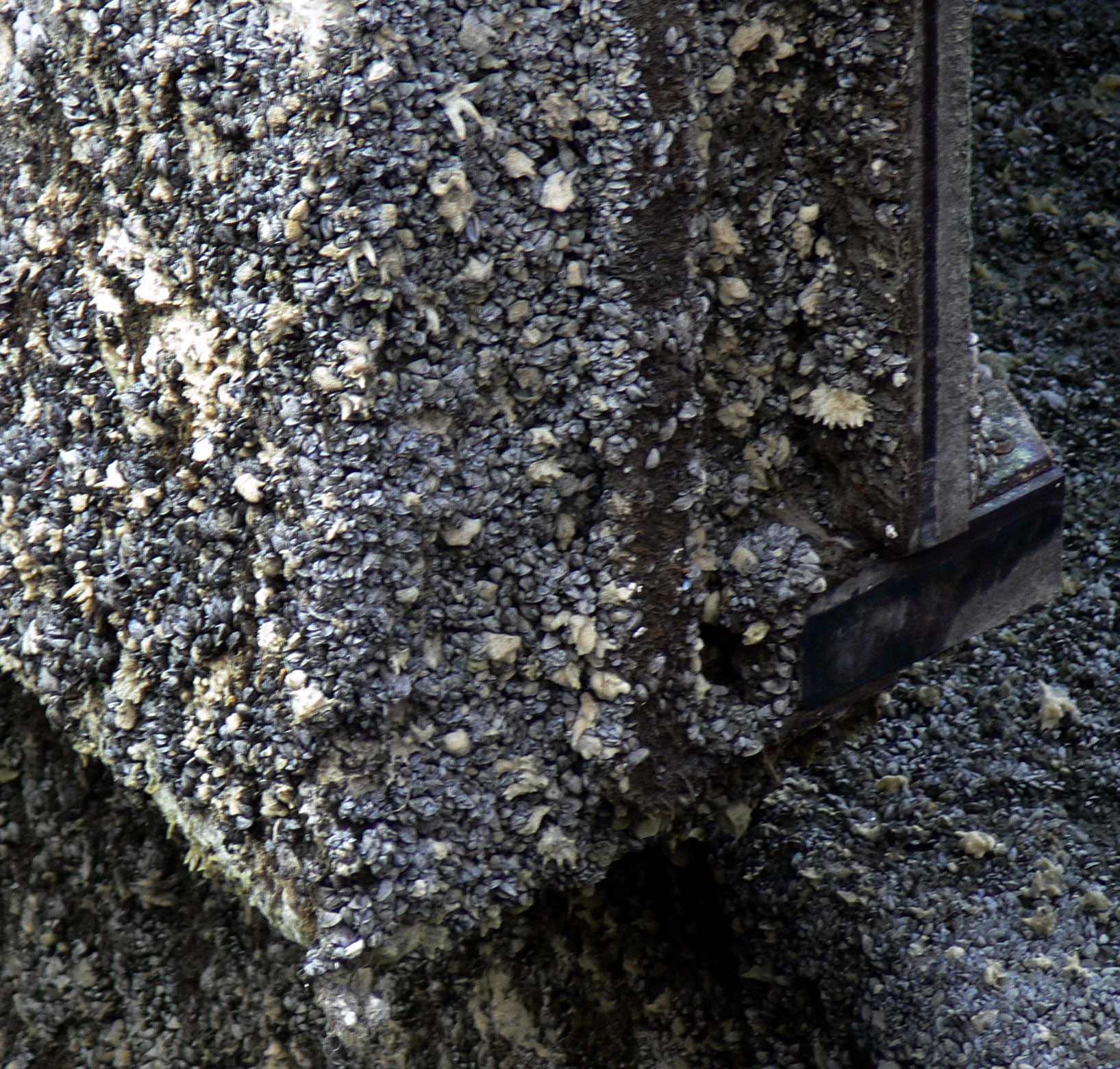
A fragment of a canal lock in Northern France, covered with zebra mussels

Biofouling or biological fouling is the undesirable accumulation of micro-organisms, algae and diatoms, plants, and animals on surfaces, such as ships and submarine hulls, or piping and reservoirs with untreated water. This can be accompanied by microbiologically influenced corrosion (MIC).

Bacteria can form biofilms or slimes. Thus the organisms can aggregate on surfaces using colloidal hydrogels of water and extracellular polymeric substances (EPS) (polysaccharides, lipids, nucleic acids, etc.). The biofilm structure is usually complex.

Bacterial fouling can occur under either aerobic (with oxygen dissolved in water) or anaerobic (no oxygen) conditions. In practice, aerobic bacteria prefer open systems, when both oxygen and nutrients are constantly delivered, often in warm and sunlit environments. Anaerobic fouling more often occurs in closed systems when sufficient nutrients are present. Examples may include sulfate-reducing bacteria (or sulfur-reducing bacteria), which produce sulfide and often cause corrosion of ferrous metals (and other alloys). Sulfide-oxidizing bacteria (e.g., Acidithiobacillus), on the other hand, can produce sulfuric acid, and can be involved in corrosion of concrete.

Zebra mussels serve as an example of larger animals that have caused widespread fouling in North America.

=== Composite fouling ===
Composite fouling is common. This type of fouling involves more than one foulant or more than one fouling mechanism working simultaneously. The multiple foulants or mechanisms may interact with each other resulting in a synergistic fouling which is not a simple arithmetic sum of the individual components.

=== Fouling on Mars ===
NASA Mars Exploration Rovers (Spirit and Opportunity) experienced (presumably) abiotic fouling of solar panels by dust particles from the Martian atmosphere. Some of the deposits subsequently spontaneously cleaned off. This illustrates the universal nature of the fouling phenomena.

== Quantification of fouling ==
The most straightforward way to quantify fairly uniform fouling is by stating the average deposit surface loading, i.e., kg of deposit per m^{2} of surface area. The fouling rate will then be expressed in kg/m^{2}s, and it is obtained by dividing the deposit surface loading by the effective operating time. The normalized fouling rate (also in kg/m^{2}s) will additionally account for the concentration of the foulant in the process fluid (kg/kg) during preceding operations, and is useful for comparison of fouling rates between different systems. It is obtained by dividing the fouling rate by the foulant concentration. The fouling rate constant (m/s) can be obtained by dividing the normalized fouling rate by the mass density of the process fluid (kg/m^{3}).

Deposit thickness (μm) and porosity (%) are also often used for description of fouling amount. The relative reduction of diameter of piping or increase of the surface roughness can be of particular interest when the impact of fouling on pressure drop is of interest.

In heat transfer equipment, where the primary concern is often the effect of fouling on heat transfer, fouling can be quantified by the increase of the resistance to the flow of heat (m^{2}K/W) due to fouling (termed "fouling resistance"), or by development of heat transfer coefficient (W/m^{2}K) with time.

If under-deposit or crevice corrosion is of primary concern, it is important to note non-uniformity of deposit thickness (e.g., deposit waviness), localized fouling, packing of confined regions with deposits, creation of occlusions, "crevices", "deposit tubercles", or sludge piles. Such deposit structures can create environment for underdeposit corrosion of the substrate material, e.g., intergranular attack, pitting, stress corrosion cracking, or localized wastage. Porosity and permeability of the deposits will likely influence the probability of underdeposit corrosion. Deposit composition can also be important - even minor components of the deposits can sometimes cause severe corrosion of the underlying metal (e.g., vanadium in deposits of fired boilers causing hot corrosion).

There is no general rule on how much deposit can be tolerated, it depends on the system. In many cases, a deposit even a few micrometers thick can be troublesome. A deposit in a millimeter-range thickness will be of concern in almost any application.

== Progress of fouling with time ==
Deposit on a surface does not always develop steadily with time. The following fouling scenarios can be distinguished, depending on the nature of the system and the local thermohydraulic conditions at the surface:

- Induction period - Sometimes, a near-nil fouling rate is observed when the surface is new or very clean. This is often observed in biofouling and precipitation fouling. After the "induction period", the fouling rate increases.
- "Negative" fouling - This can occur when fouling rate is quantified by monitoring heat transfer. Relatively small amounts of deposit can improve heat transfer, relative to clean surface, and give an appearance of "negative" fouling rate and negative total fouling amount. Negative fouling is often observed under nucleate-boiling heat-transfer conditions (deposit improves bubble nucleation) or forced-convection (if the deposit increases the surface roughness and the surface is no longer "hydraulically smooth"). After the initial period of "surface roughness control", the fouling rate usually becomes strongly positive.
- Linear fouling - The fouling rate can be steady with time. This is a common case.
- Falling fouling - In this scenario, the fouling rate decreases with time, but never drops to zero. The deposit thickness does not achieve a constant value. The progress of fouling can be often described by two numbers: the initial fouling rate (a tangent to the fouling curve at zero deposit loading or zero time) and the fouling rate after a long period of time (an oblique asymptote to the fouling curve).
- Asymptotic fouling - Here, the fouling rate decreases with time, until it finally reaches zero. At this point, the deposit thickness remains constant with time (a horizontal asymptote). This is often the case for relatively soft or poorly adherent deposits in areas of fast flow. The asymptote is usually interpreted as the deposit loading at which the deposition rate equals the deposit removal rate.
- Accelerating fouling - In this scenario, the fouling rate increases with time; the rate of deposit buildup accelerates with time (perhaps until it becomes transport limited). Mechanistically, this scenario can develop when fouling increases the surface roughness, or when the deposit surface exhibits higher chemical propensity to fouling than the pure underlying metal.
- Seesaw fouling - Here, fouling loading generally increases with time (often assuming a generally linear or falling rate), but, when looked at in more detail, the fouling progress is periodically interrupted and takes the form of sawtooth curve. The periodic sharp variations in the apparent fouling amount often correspond to the moments of system shutdowns, startups or other transients in operation. The periodic variations are often interpreted as periodic removal of some of the deposit (perhaps deposit re-suspension due to pressure pulses, spalling due thermal stresses, or exfoliation due to redox transients). Steam blanketing has been postulated to occur between the partially spalled deposits and the heat transfer surface. However, other reasons are possible, e.g., trapping of air inside the surface deposits during shutdowns, or inaccuracy of temperature measurements during transients ("temperature streaming").

== Fouling modelling ==
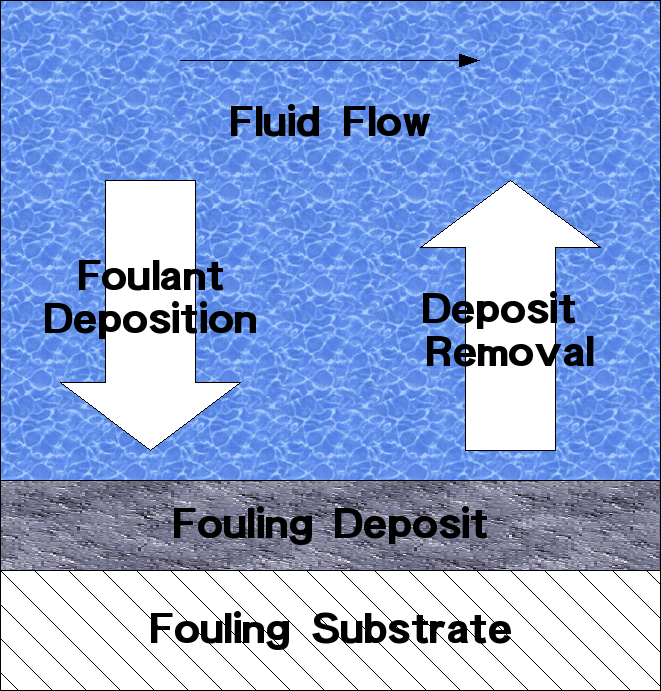
Schematics of the fouling process consisting of simultaneous foulant deposition and deposit removal.

Fouling of a system can be modelled as consisting of several steps:

- Generation or ingress of the species that causes fouling ("foulant sourcing");
- Foulant transport with the stream of the process fluid (most often by advection);
- Foulant transport from the bulk of the process fluid to the fouling surface. This transport is often by molecular or turbulent-eddy diffusion, but may also occur by inertial coasting/impaction, particle interception by the surface (for particles with finite sizes), electrophoresis, thermophoresis, diffusiophoresis, Stefan flow (in condensation and evaporation), sedimentation, Magnus force (acting on rotating particles), thermoelectric effect, and other mechanisms.
- Induction period, i.e., a near-nil fouling rate at the initial period of fouling (observed only for some fouling mechanisms);
- Foulant crystallisation on the surface (or attachment of the colloidal particle, or chemical reaction, or bacterial growth);
- Sometimes fouling autoretardation, i.e., reduction (or potentially enhancement) of crystallisation/attachment rate due to changes in the surface conditions caused by the fouling deposit;
- Deposit dissolution (or re-entrainment of loosely attached particles);
- Deposit consolidation on the surface (e.g., through Ostwald ripening or differential solubility in temperature gradient) or cementation, which account for deposit losing its porosity and becoming more tenacious with time;
- Deposit spalling, erosion wear, or exfoliation.

Deposition consists of transport to the surface and subsequent attachment. Deposit removal is either through deposit dissolution, particle re-entrainment, or deposit spalling, erosive wear, or exfoliation. Fouling results from foulant generation, foulant deposition, deposit removal, and deposit consolidation.

For the modern model of fouling involving deposition with simultaneous deposit re-entrainment and consolidation, the fouling process can be represented by the following scheme:

[ rate of deposit accumulation ] = [ rate of deposition ] - [ rate of re-entrainment of unconsolidated deposit ]

[ rate of accumulation of unconsolidated deposit ] = [ rate of deposition ] - [ rate of re-entrainment of unconsolidated deposit ] - [ rate of consolidation of unconsolidated deposit ]

Following the above scheme, the basic fouling equations can be written as follows (for steady-state conditions with flow, when concentration remains constant with time):

$$\begin{cases}
{dm/dt}=k_d C_m \rho - \lambda_r m_r(t) \\
{dm_r/dt}=k_d C_m \rho - \lambda_r m_r(t) - \lambda_c \cdot m_r(t)
\end{cases}$$

where:

- m is the mass loading of the deposit (consolidated and unconsolidated) on the surface (kg/m^{2});
- t is time (s);
- k_{d} is the deposition rate constant (m/s);
- ρ is the fluid density (kg/m^{3});
- C_{m} - mass fraction of foulant in the fluid (kg/kg);
- λ_{r} is the re-entrainment rate constant (1/s);
- m_{r} is the mass loading of the removable (i.e., unconsolidated) fraction of the surface deposit (kg/m^{2}); and
- λ_{c} is the consolidation rate constant (1/s).

This system of equations can be integrated (taking that m = 0 and m_{r} = 0 at t = 0) to the form:

$$m(t) = {{k_d C_m \rho} \over {\lambda}}  \left( t \lambda_c + {{\lambda_r} \over {\lambda}} \left( 1 - e^{-\lambda t} \right) \right)$$

where λ = λ_{r} + λ_{c}.

This model reproduces either linear, falling, or asymptotic fouling, depending on the relative values of k, λ_{r}, and λ_{c}. The underlying physical picture for this model is that of a two-layer deposit consisting of consolidated inner layer and loose unconsolidated outer layer. Such a bi-layer deposit is often observed in practice. The above model simplifies readily to the older model of simultaneous deposition and re-entrainment (which neglects consolidation) when λ_{c}=0. In the absence of consolidation, the asymptotic fouling is always anticipated by this older model and the fouling progress can be described as:

$$m(t) = m^* \left( 1 - e^{-\lambda_r t} \right)$$

where m^{*} is the maximum (asymptotic) mass loading of the deposit on the surface (kg/m^{2}).

== Economic and environmental importance of fouling ==
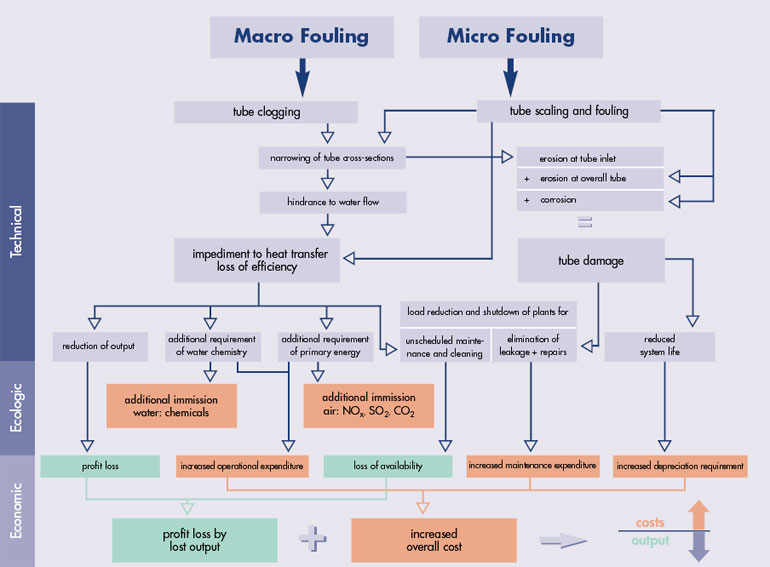
Cost relations between the individual types of fouling

Fouling is ubiquitous and generates tremendous operational losses, not unlike corrosion. For example, one estimate puts the losses due to fouling of heat exchangers in industrialized nations to be about 0.25% of their GDP. Another analysis estimated (for 2006) the economical loss due to boiler and turbine fouling in China utilities at 4.68 billion dollars, which is about 0.169% the country GDP.

The losses initially result from impaired heat transfer, corrosion damage (in particular under-deposit and crevice corrosion), increased pressure drop, flow blockages, flow redistribution inside components, flow instabilities, induced vibrations (possibly leading to other problems, e.g., fatigue), fretting, premature failure of electrical heating elements, and a large number of other often unanticipated problems. In addition, the ecological costs should be (but typically are not) considered. The ecological costs arise from the use of biocides for the avoidance of biofouling, from the increased fuel input to compensate for the reduced output caused by fouling, and an increased use of cooling water in once-through cooling systems.

For example, "normal" fouling at a conventionally fired 500 MW (net electrical power) power station unit accounts for output losses of the steam turbine of 5 MW and more. In a 1,300 MW nuclear power station, typical losses could be 20 MW and up (up to 100% if the station shuts down due to fouling-induced component degradation). In seawater desalination plants, fouling may reduce the gained output ratio by two-digit percentages (the gained output ratio is an equivalent that puts the mass of generated distillate in relation to the steam used in the process). The extra electrical consumption in compressor-operated coolers is also easily in the two-digit area. In addition to the operational costs, also the capital cost increases because the heat exchangers have to be designed in larger sizes to compensate for the heat-transfer loss due to fouling. To the output losses listed above, one needs to add the cost of down-time required to inspect, clean, and repair the components (millions of dollars per day of shutdown in lost revenue in a typical power plant), and the cost of actually doing this maintenance. Finally, fouling is often a root cause of serious degradation problems that may limit the life of components or entire plants.

== Fouling control ==
The most fundamental and usually preferred method of controlling fouling is to prevent the ingress of the fouling species into the cooling water circuit. In steam power stations and other major industrial installations of water technology, macro fouling is avoided by way of pre-filtration and cooling water debris filters. Some plants employ foreign-object exclusion program (to eliminate the possibility of salient introduction of unwanted materials, e.g., forgetting tools during maintenance). Acoustic monitoring is sometimes employed to monitor for fretting by detached parts. In the case of micro fouling, water purification is achieved with extensive methods of water treatment, microfiltration, membrane technology (reverse osmosis, electrodeionization) or ion-exchange resins. The generation of the corrosion products in the water piping systems is often minimized by controlling the pH of the process fluid (typically alkalinization with ammonia, morpholine, ethanolamine or sodium phosphate), control of oxygen dissolved in water (for example, by addition of hydrazine), or addition of corrosion inhibitors.

For water systems at relatively low temperatures, the applied biocides may be classified as follows: inorganic chlorine and bromide compounds, chlorine and bromide cleavers, ozone and oxygen cleavers, unoxidizable biocides. One of the most important unoxidizable biocides is a mixture of chloromethyl-isothiazolinone and methyl-isothiazolinone. Also applied are dibrom nitrilopropionamide and quaternary ammonium compounds. For underwater ship hulls bottom paints are applied.

Chemical fouling inhibitors can reduce fouling in many systems, mainly by interfering with the crystallization, attachment, or consolidation steps of the fouling process. Examples for water systems are: chelating agents (for example, EDTA), long-chain aliphatic amines or polyamines (for example, octadecylamine, helamin, and other "film-forming" amines), organic phosphonic acids (for example, etidronic acid), or polyelectrolytes (for example, polyacrylic acid, polymethacrylic acid, usually with a molecular weight lower than 10000). For fired boilers, aluminum or magnesium additives can lower the melting point of ash and promote creation of deposits which are easier to remove. See also process chemicals.

Magnetic water treatment has been a subject of controversy as to its effectiveness for fouling control since the 1950s. The prevailing opinion is that it simply "does not work". Nevertheless, some studies suggest that it may be effective under some conditions to reduce buildup of calcium carbonate deposits.

On the component design level, fouling can often (but not always) be minimized by maintaining a relatively high (for example, 2 m/s) and uniform fluid velocity throughout the component. Stagnant regions need to be eliminated. Components are normally overdesigned to accommodate the fouling anticipated between cleanings. However, a significant overdesign can be a design error because it may lead to increased fouling due to reduced velocities. Periodic on-line pressure pulses or backflow can be effective if the capability is carefully incorporated at the design time. Blowdown capability is always incorporated into steam generators or evaporators to control the accumulation of non-volatile impurities that cause or aggravate fouling. Low-fouling surfaces (for example, very smooth, implanted with ions, or of low surface energy like Teflon) are an option for some applications. Modern components are typically required to be designed for ease of inspection of internals and periodic cleaning. On-line fouling monitoring systems are designed for some application so that blowing or cleaning can be applied before unpredictable shutdown is necessary or damage occurs.

Chemical or mechanical cleaning processes for the removal of deposits and scales are recommended when fouling reaches the point of impacting the system performance or an onset of significant fouling-induced degradation (e.g., by corrosion). These processes comprise pickling with acids and complexing agents, cleaning with high-velocity water jets ("water lancing"), recirculating ("blasting") with metal, sponge or other balls, or propelling offline mechanical "bullet-type" tube cleaners. Whereas chemical cleaning causes environmental problems through the handling, application, storage and disposal of chemicals, the mechanical cleaning by means of circulating cleaning balls or offline "bullet-type" cleaning can be an environmentally friendlier alternative. In some heat-transfer applications, mechanical mitigation with dynamic scraped surface heat exchangers is an option. Also ultrasonic or abrasive cleaning methods are available for many specific applications.

== See also ==
- International Convention on the Control of Harmful Anti-fouling Systems on Ships
- Oilfield scale inhibition
- Particle deposition
- Steam generator (nuclear power)
- Tube cleaning
