= International Convention on the Control of Harmful Anti-fouling Systems on Ships =

International Maritime Organization treaty

The International Convention on the Control of Harmful Anti-fouling Systems in Ships (AFS Convention) is a 2001 International Maritime Organization (IMO) treaty whereby states agree to prohibit the use of harmful anti-fouling paints and other anti-fouling systems that contain harmful substances. In particular, the use of the organotin tributyltin is prohibited, since leaching of that chemical from the hulls of ships has been shown to cause deformations in oysters and sex changes in whelks.

The convention was concluded in London on 5 October 2001 and entered into force on 17 September 2008. As of November 2018, it has been ratified by 81 states, which includes 79 United Nations member states plus the Cook Islands and Niue. A ratifying state agrees to enforce the prohibitions of the convention on all ships flying its flag and on any ship that enters a port, shipyard, or offshore terminal of the state. The 81 ratifying states represent approximately 94 per cent of the gross tonnage of the world's merchant fleets.
