= Fouling community =

Community of organisms found on artificial surfaces

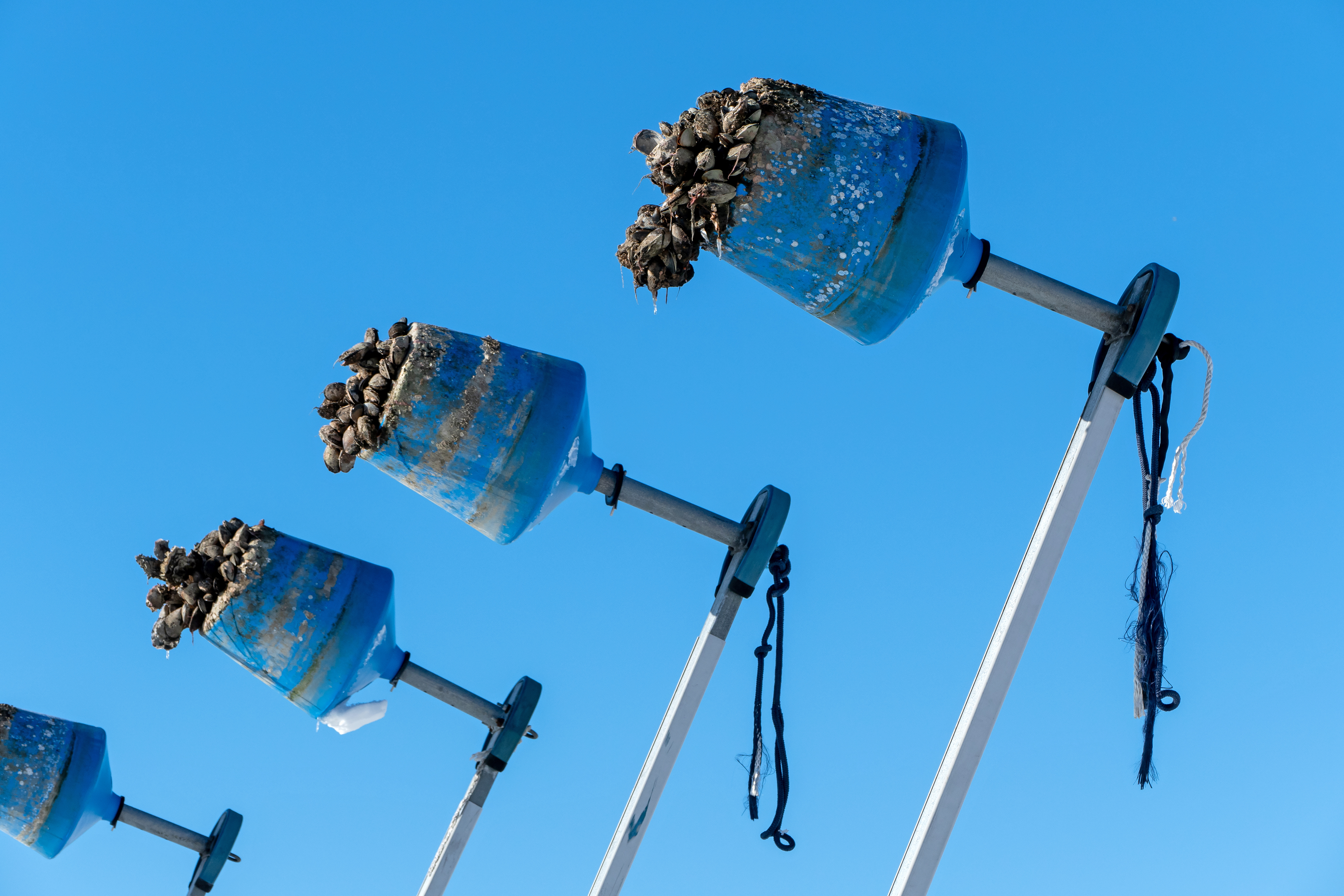
A community of mussels found attached to a dock in Sweden. These manmade structures provide a home for species like mussels, algae, ascidians, and other organisms.

Fouling communities are communities of organisms found on artificial surfaces like the sides of docks, marinas, harbors, and boats. Settlement panels made from a variety of substances have been used to monitor settlement patterns and to examine several community processes (e.g., succession, recruitment, predation, competition, and invasion resistance). These communities are characterized by the presence of a variety of sessile organisms including ascidians, bryozoans, mussels, tube building polychaetes, sea anemones, sponges, barnacles, and more. Common predators on and around fouling communities include small crabs, starfish, fish, limpets, chitons, other gastropods, and a variety of worms.

== Ecology ==
Fouling communities follow a distinct succession pattern in a natural environment.

== Environmental impact ==
=== Impacts on Humans ===
Fouling communities can have a negative economic impact on humans, by damaging the bottom of boats, docks, and other marine human-made structures. This effect is known as Biofouling, and has been combated by Anti-fouling paint, which is now known to introduce toxic metals to the marine environment. Fouling communities have a variety of species, and many of these are filter feeders, meaning that organisms in the fouling community can also improve water clarity.

=== Invasive Species ===
Fouling communities do grow on natural structures, however these communities are largely made up of native species, whereas the communities growing on man-made structures have larger populations of invasive species. This difference between the species diversity across human structures and natural substrate is likely dependent on human pollution, which is known to weaken native species and create a community and environment dominated by non-indigenous species. These largely non-indigenous species communities living on docks and boats usually have a higher resistance to anthropogenic disturbances. This effect is sorely felt in untouched native marine communities, as non-indigenous species growing on boat hulls are transported across the world, to wherever the boat anchors.

== Research history ==
Fouling communities were highlighted particularly in the literature of marine ecology as a potential example of alternate stable states through the work of John Sutherland in the 1970s at Duke University, although this was later called into question by Connell and Sousa.

Fouling communities have been used to test the ecological effectiveness of artificial coral reefs.

== See also ==
- Biofouling
- Ecological succession
- Didemnum vexillum
