= Anti-fouling paint =

Specialized paint for ship hulls

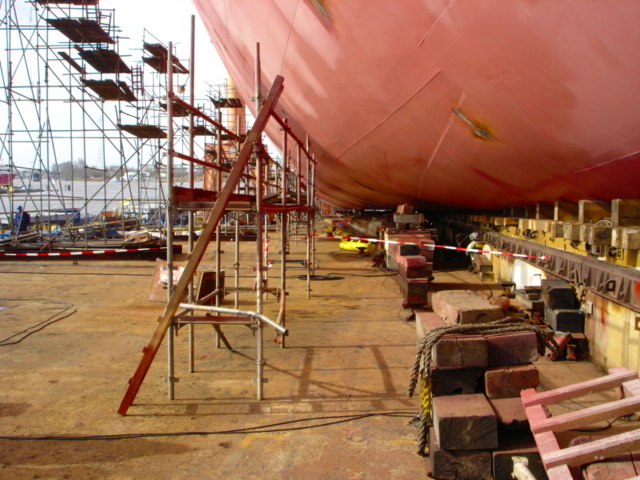
New ship being prepared for launch, showing fresh anti-fouling paint

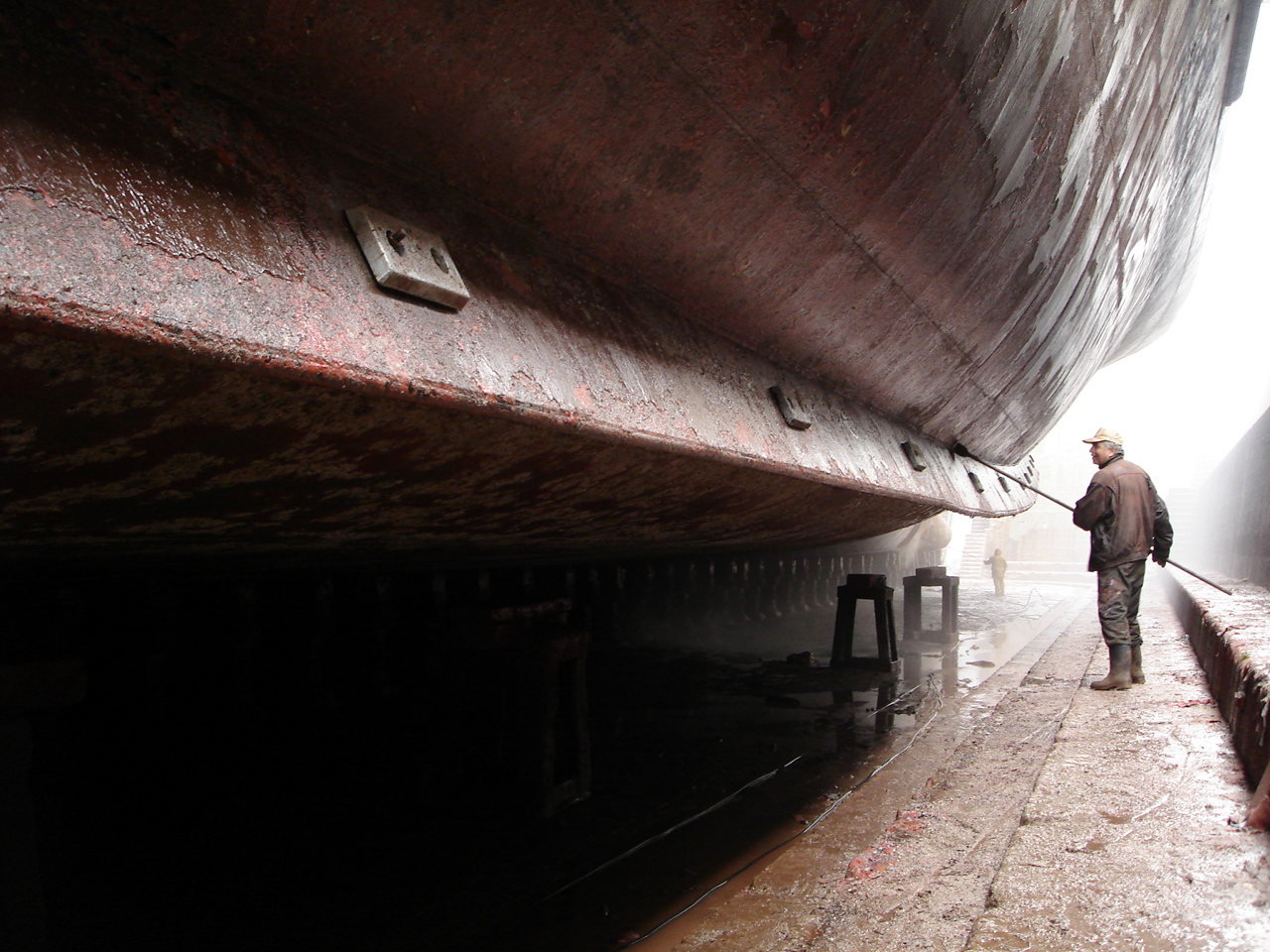
Ship hull being cleaned of fouling in drydock

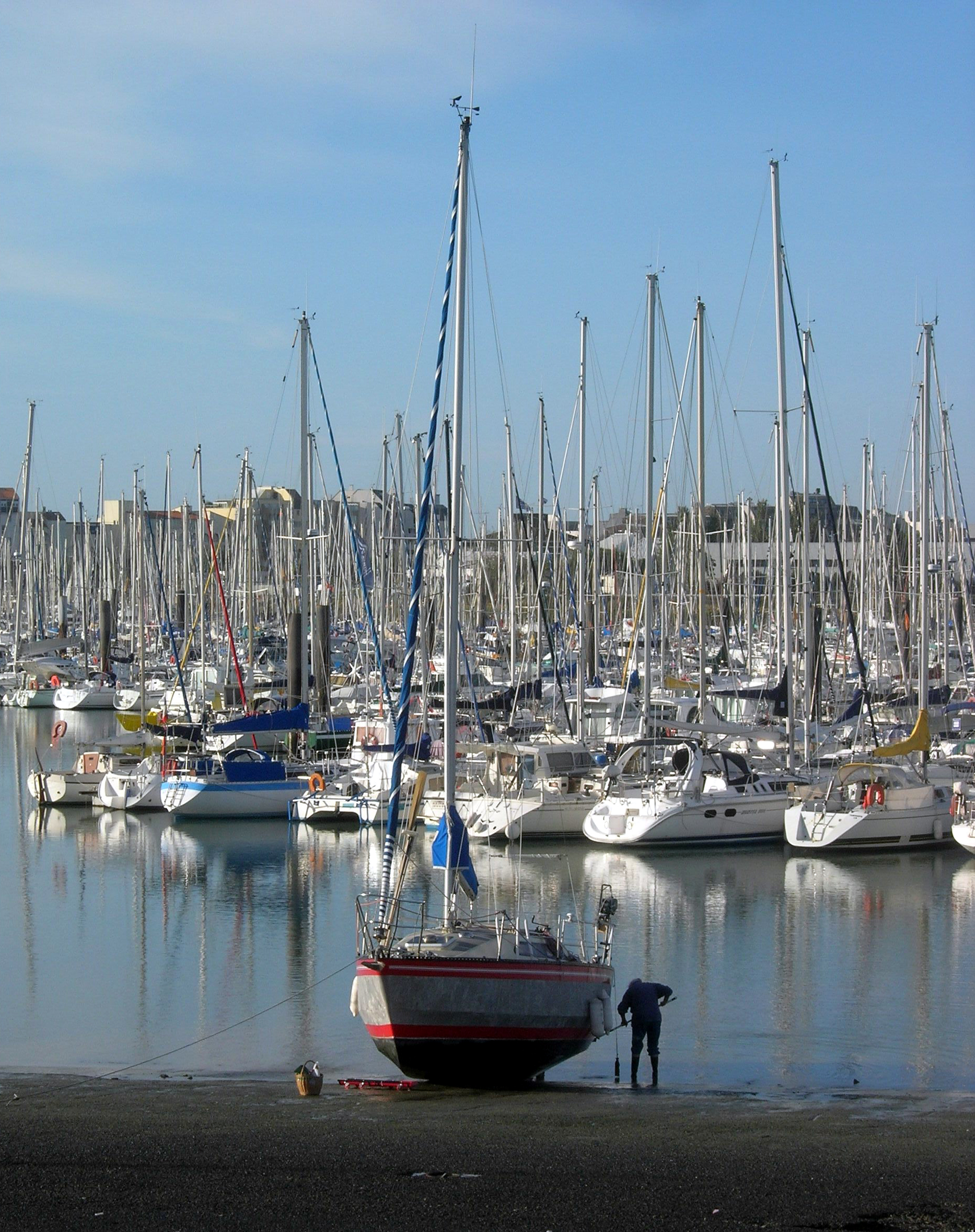

Anti-fouling paint is a specialized category of coatings applied as the outer (outboard) layer to the hull of a ship or boat, to slow the growth of and facilitate detachment of subaquatic organisms that attach to the hull and can affect a vessel's performance and durability. It falls into a category of commercially available underwater hull paints, also known as bottom paints.

Anti-fouling paints are often applied as one component of multi-layer coating systems which may have other functions in addition to their antifouling properties, such as acting as a barrier against corrosion on metal hulls that will degrade and weaken the metal, or improving the flow of water past the hull of a fishing vessel or high-performance racing yachts. Although commonly discussed as being applied to ships, antifouling paints are also of benefit in many other sectors such as off-shore structures and fish farms.

== History ==
In the Age of Sail, sailing vessels suffered severely from the growth of barnacles and weeds on the hull, called "fouling". Starting in the mid-1700s thin sheets of copper and approximately 100 years later, Muntz metal, were nailed onto the hull in an attempt to prevent marine growth. One famous example of the traditional use of metal sheathing is the clipper Cutty Sark, which is preserved as a museum ship in dry-dock at Greenwich in England. Marine growth affected performance (and profitability) in many ways:

- The maximum speed of a ship decreases as its hull becomes fouled with marine growth, and its displacement increases.
- Fouling hampers a ship's ability to sail upwind.
- Some marine growth, such as shipworms, would bore into the hull causing severe damage over time.
- The ship may transport harmful marine organisms to other areas.

While anti-fouling coatings began to be developed from 1840 onwards, the first practical commercial anti-fouling coatings were established around 1860. One of the first successful commercial patents was for 'McIness', a metallic soap compound with copper sulphate that was applied heated over a quick-drying rosin varnish primer with an iron oxide pigment. The Bonnington Chemical Works began marketing copper sulphide anti-fouling paint around 1850. Other widely used anti-fouling paints were developed in the late 19th century, with some 213 anti-fouling patents being recorded by 1872. Among the most widely used in the 1880s and 1890s was a hot plastic composition known as Italian Morovian.

In an official 1900 Letter from the U.S. Navy to the U.S. Senate Committee on Naval Affairs, it was noted that the (British) Admiralty had considered a proposal in 1847 to limit the number of iron ships (only recently introduced into naval service) and even to consider the sale of all iron ships in its possession, due to significant problems with biofouling. However, once an antifouling paint "with very fair results" was found, the iron ships were instead retained and continued to be built.

During World War II, which included a substantial naval component, the U.S. Navy provided significant funding to the Woods Hole Oceanographic Institution to gather information and conduct research on marine biofouling and technologies for its prevention. This work was published as a book in 1952, the contents of which are available online as individual chapters. The third and final part of this book includes a number of chapters that go into the state of the art at that time for the formulation of anti-fouling paints. Lunn (1974) provides further history.

== Modern antifouling paints ==
In modern times, antifouling paints are formulated with cuprous oxide (or other copper compounds) and/or other biocides—special chemicals which impede growth of barnacles, algae, and marine organisms. Historically, copper paints were red, leading to ship bottoms still being painted red today.

"Soft", or ablative bottom paints slowly slough off in the water, releasing a copper or zinc based biocide into the water column. The movement of water increases the rate of this action. Ablative paints are widely used on the hulls of recreational vessels and are typically reapplied every 1–3 years.

"Hard" bottom paints, or "nonsloughing" bottom paints, are made in several types. "Contact leaching" paints "create a porous film on the surface. Biocides are held in the pores, and released slowly." Another type of hard bottom paint includes Teflon and silicone coatings which are too slippery for growth to stick. SealCoat systems, which must be professionally applied, dry with small fibers sticking out from the coating surface. These small fibers move in the water, preventing bottom growth from adhering.

== Environmental concerns ==
In the 1960s and 1970s, commercial vessels commonly used bottom paints containing tributyltin, which has been banned in the International Convention on the Control of Harmful Anti-fouling Systems on Ships of the International Maritime Organization due to its serious toxic effects on marine life (such as the collapse of a French shellfish fishery). Now that tributyltin has been banned, the most commonly used anti-fouling bottom paints are copper-based. Copper-based antifouling paints can also have adverse effects on marine organisms. Copper occurs naturally in aquatic systems but can build up in ports or marinas where there are lots of boats. Copper can leach out of anti-fouling paint from the hulls of the boats or fall off the hulls in different sized paint particles. This can lead to higher-than-normal concentrations of copper in the ports or bays.

This excess of copper in the marine ecosystem can have adverse effects on the marine environment and its organisms. In marinas, the river nerite, a brackish water snail, was found to have higher mortality, negative growth, and a large decrease in reproduction compared to areas with no boating. The snails in marinas had more tissue (histopathological) issues and alterations in areas like their gills and gonads as well. Increased exposure to copper from antifouling paint has also been found to decrease enzyme activity in brine shrimp.

Antifouling paint particles can be eaten by zooplankton or other marine species and move up the food chain, bioaccumulating in fish. This accumulation of copper through the food web can cause damage to not only the species eating the particle, but those that are accumulating it in their tissues from their diet. Antifouling paint particles can also end up in the sediment of harbors or bays and damage the benthic environment or the organisms that live in them. These are the known effects of copper based antifouling paint; however, it has not been a large focus of study so the extent of the effects is not fully known. More research is needed to fully understand how these paints and the metals in them affect their environments.

The Port of San Diego is investigating how to reduce copper input from copper-based antifouling coatings, and Washington State has passed a law which may phase in a ban on copper antifouling coatings on recreational vessels beginning in January 2018. However, despite the toxic chemistry of bottom paint and its accumulation in water ways across the globe, a similar ban was rescinded in the Netherlands after the European Union's Scientific Committee on Health and Environmental Risks concluded The Hague had insufficiently justified the law. In an expert opinion, the committee concluded the Netherlands government's explanation "does not provide sufficient sound scientific evidence to show that the use of copper-based antifouling paints in leisure boats presents significant environmental risk."

"Sloughing bottom paints", or "ablative" paints, are an older type of paint designed to create a hull coating which ablates (wears off) slowly, exposing a fresh layer of biocides. Scrubbing a hull with sloughing bottom paint while it is in the water releases its biocides into the environment. One way to reduce the environmental impact from hulls with sloughing bottom paint is to have them hauled out and cleaned at boatyards with a "closed loop" system.

Some innovative bottom paints that do not rely on copper or tin have been developed in response to the increasing scrutiny that copper-based ablative bottom paints have received as environmental pollutants.

A possible future replacement for antifouling paint may be slime. A mesh would cover a ship's hull beneath which a series of pores would supply the slime compound. The compound would turn into a viscous slime on contact with water and coat the mesh. The slime would constantly slough off, carrying away micro-organisms and barnacle larvae.

== See also ==
- Biofouling
- Biomimetic antifouling coating
- Environmental impact of paint
