= Polysulfobetaine =

Dipolar ion polymer

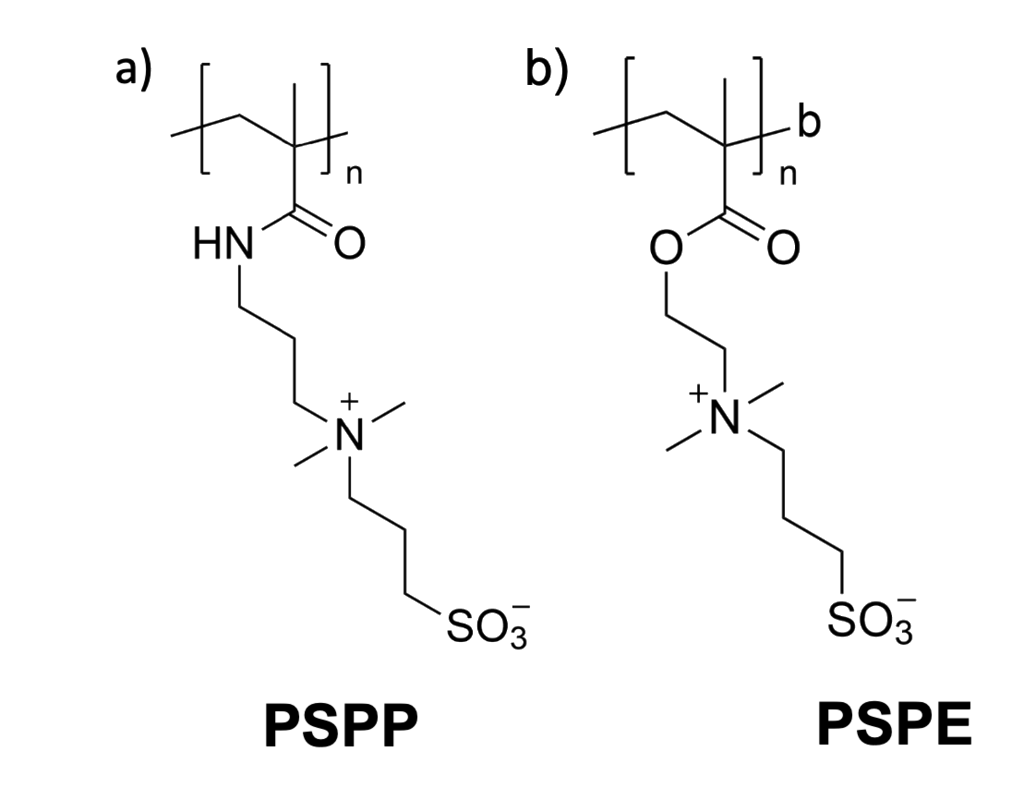
Chemical structures of polysulfobetaines containing (a) quaternary ammonium amide of methacrylic acid (PSPP) and (b) quaternary ammonium ester of methacrylic acid (PSPE).

Polysulfobetaines are zwitterionic polymers that contain a positively charged quaternary ammonium and a negatively charged sulfonate group within one constitutional repeat unit. In recent years, polysulfobetaines have received increasing attention owing to their good biotolerance and ultralow-fouling behavior towards surfaces. These properties are mainly referred to a tightly bound hydration layer around each zwitterionic group, which effectively suppresses protein adsorption and thus, improves anti-fouling behavior. Therefore, polysulfobetaines have been typically employed as ultrafiltration membranes, blood-contacting devices, and drug delivery materials.

The chemical structure of polysulfobetaines can be divided in several subgroups. Most widespread are amides of (meth)acrylic acid ('PSPP') or quaternary esters ('PSPE'). Also, compounds from poly(vinylpyridinium), poly(vinylimidazolium), or quaternary poly(pyrrolidinium) as well as zwitterionic ionenes, are often found.

== Synthesis ==
Polysulfobetaines are generally synthesized via free radical polymerization. However, the synthesis of polysulfobetaines is often limited by their poor solubility in most solvents and at present, only few sulfobetaine monomers that are suited for free radical polymerization, are commercially available. The most popular ones are SPE and SPP, which provide a good combination of hydrophilicity and polymerizability.

== Solution behavior ==
Almost all polysulfobetaines are insoluble in water at low temperatures, however many polysulfobetaines feature an upper critical solution temperature (UCST) in aqueous solution. This means they undergo a coil-to-globule collapse transition upon cooling. Such a behavior is highly unusual, since other zwitterionic polymers, e.g., poly(phosphatidylcholines) and poly(carboxybetaines) do generally not feature a responsive behavior towards a temperature stimulus.

The reason for the UCST-type behavior of polysulfobetaines in solution is based on their electrically neutral behavior, i.e., the overall charge is zero, over a large pH range (approximately 2 – 14). Due to the neutralization of the charges, repulsive and attractive interactions are present between the individual polymer chains and inner salt are formed. The balance of this complex interplay of interactions between numerous charged groups with water and with themselves, strongly affects the solubility of polysulfobetaines in water and eventually, results in an UCST-type transition. The temperature of this phase transition, often called clearing point, is very sensitive to molar mass, polymer architecture, solvent isotopes, e.g., H_{2}O/D_{2}O, and especially to the addition of salts to the solution.

The presence of salt additives in aqueous solution leads to an altered balance of the attractive and repulsive interactions and therefore, also to an altered solubility. Especially, the nature of the salt anion has a strong effect on the solubility of the polysulfobetaines. While chaotropic anions cause an improved dissolution (salting-in effect), kosmotropic anions result in precipitation of the polysulfobetaines (salting-out effect).

== Thin films from polysulfobetaines ==
Thin films made from polysulfobetaines also feature a thermo-responsiveness, however, the phase transition is strongly shifted, which is mainly addressed to the increased polymer concentration and the altered polymer-polymer and polymer-water interactions. Furthermore, and analogously to aqueous solutions, different water isotopes (H_{2}O/D_{2}O) and salt additives were found to affect the phase transition as well. Interestingly, polysulfobetaine thin films feature a cononsolvency effect in mixed water/methanol vapors, which is not found in water/methanol solution. Apparently, polysulfobetaines feature a miscibility with lower alcohols at the substance-rich side of their phase diagrams.
