= Sticking probability =

The sticking probability is the probability that molecules are trapped on surfaces and adsorb chemically. From Langmuir's adsorption isotherm, molecules cannot adsorb on surfaces when the adsorption sites are already occupied by other molecules, so the sticking probability can be expressed as follows:

$S=S_0(1-\theta)$

where $S_0$ is the initial sticking probability and $\theta$ is the surface coverage fraction ranging from 0 to 1.

Similarly, when molecules adsorb on surfaces dissociatively, the sticking probability is

$S=S_0(1-\theta)^2$

The square is because a disassociation of 1 molecule into 2 parts requires 2 adsorption sites. These equations are simple and can be easily understood but cannot explain experimental results.

In 1958, P. Kisliuk presented an equation for the sticking probability that can explain experimental results. In his theory, molecules are trapped in precursor states of physisorption before chemisorption. Then the molecules meet adsorption sites that molecules can adsorb to chemically, so the molecules behave as follows.

If these sites are not occupied, molecules do the following (with probability in parentheses):

1. adsorb on the surface chemically ($P_a$)
2. desorb from the surface ($P_b$)
3. move to the next precursor state ($P_c$)

and if these sites are occupied, they

1. desorb from the surface ($P_b'$)
2. move to the next precursor state ($P_c'$)

Note that an occupied site is defined as one where there is a chemically bonded adsorbate so by definition it would be $P_a'=0$. Then the sticking probability is, according to equation (6) of the reference,

$S=S_0\left(1+\frac{\theta}{1-\theta} K \right)^{-1} = S_0 \frac{1-\theta}{1 + (K-1)\theta}$

$K = \frac{P_b'}{P_a} + P_b$

When $K=1$, this equation is identical in result to Langmuir's adsorption isotherm.
