= Charles Perry (traveller) =

English traveller and medical writer

Charles Perry (1698–1780) was an English traveller and medical writer.

== Publications ==
Perry's publications included:

- A treatise of diseases in general : wherein the true causes, natures, and essences of all the principal diseases incident to the human body, are ... explain'd ..., to which is subjoined, a system of practice, applied to each disease (1741, printed for T. Woodward and C. Davis, Printers to the Royal Society)
- A view of the Levant : particularly of Constantinople, Syria, Egypt, and Greece. In which their antiquities, government, politics, maxims, manners, and customs, (with many other circumstance and contingencies) are attempted to be described and treated on. In four parts. (1743, Printed for T. Woodward ... C. Davis ... and J. Shuckburgh )
