= Bufalin =

Names
- IUPAC name 3β,14-Dihydroxy-5β-bufa-20,22-dienolide
- Systematic IUPAC name 4-[(1R,3aS,3bR,5aR,7S,9aS,9bS,11aR)-3a,7-Dihydroxy-9a,11a-dimethylhexadecahydro-1H-cyclopenta[a]phenanthren-1-yl]-2H-pyran-2-one

Identifiers
CAS Number	465-21-4
3D model (JSmol)	Interactive image
ChEBI	CHEBI:517248
ChEMBL	ChEMBL399680
ChemSpider	7826155
ECHA InfoCard	100.150.073
PubChem CID	9547215
UNII	U549S98QLW
CompTox Dashboard (EPA)	DTXSID90873563
- InChI: InChI=1S/C24H34O4/c1-22-10-7-17(25)13-16(22)4-5-20-19(22)8-11-23(2)18(9-12-24(20,23)27)15-3-6-21(26)28-14-15/h3,6,14,16-20,25,27H,4-5,7-13H2,1-2H3/t16-,17+,18-,19+,20-,22+,23-,24+/m1/s1 Key: QEEBRPGZBVVINN-BMPKRDENSA-N
- SMILES: C[C@]12CC[C@@H](C[C@H]1CC[C@@H]3[C@@H]2CC[C@]4([C@@]3(CC[C@@H]4c5ccc(=O)oc5)O)C)O

Properties
Chemical formula	C_{24}H_{34}O_{4}
Molar mass	386.532 g·mol^{−1}

Hazards
- GHS labelling
Pictograms	(GHS06: Toxic)
Signal word	Danger
Hazard statements	H300
Precautionary statements	P264, P270, P301+P310, P321, P330, P405, P501
- Except where otherwise noted, data are given for materials in their standard state (at 25 °C [77 °F], 100 kPa). Infobox references

Bufalin is a cardiotonic steroid toxin originally isolated from Chinese toad venom, which is a component of some traditional Chinese medicines.

== Research ==
Bufalin has in vitro antitumor effects against various malignant cell lines, including hepatocellular and lung carcinoma. However, as with other bufadienolides, its potential use is hampered by its cardiotoxicity.
