= Mercuric amidochloride =

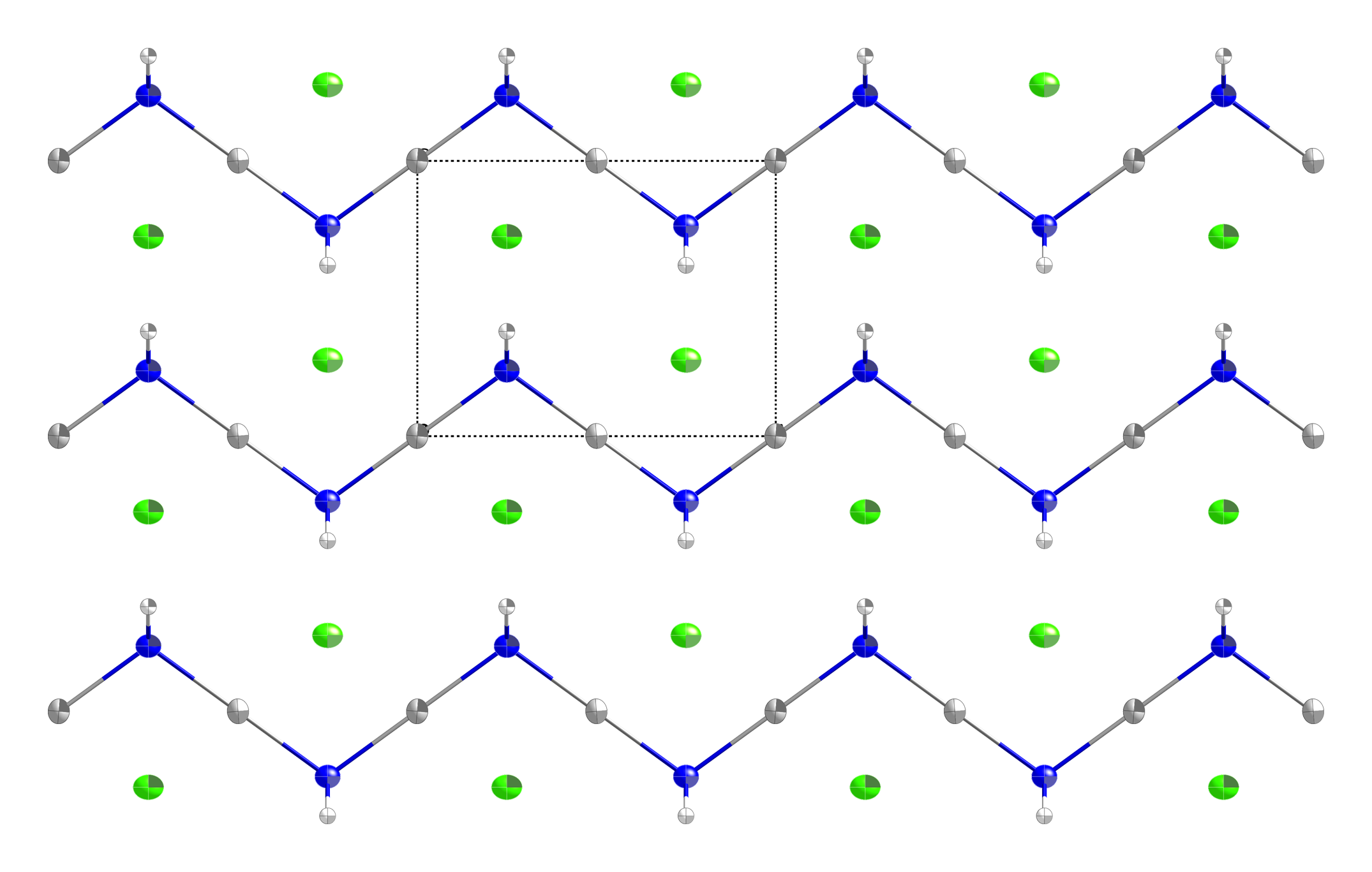

Names
- IUPAC name Mercuric azanide chloride
- Other names: Aminomercuric chloride; Ammoniated mercuric chloride; Ammoniated mercury; Mercuric amidochloride; Mercury(II) amide chloride; Mercury(II) amidochloride; Mercury(II) azanide chloride

Identifiers
CAS Number	10124-48-8
3D model (JSmol)	Interactive image
ChemSpider	21106343
ECHA InfoCard	100.030.292
PubChem CID	3032553
UNII	JD546Z56F0
CompTox Dashboard (EPA)	DTXSID70388766
- InChI: InChI=1S/ClH.Hg.H2N/h1H;;1H2/q;+2;-1/p-1 Key: WRWRKDRWMURIBI-UHFFFAOYSA-M; InChI=1/ClH.Hg.H2N/h1H;;1H2/q;+2;-1/p-1/rClH2HgN/c1-2-3/h3H2 Key: WRWRKDRWMURIBI-CUFRCDTJAQ
- SMILES: Cl[Hg]N

Properties
Chemical formula	Hg(NH_{2})Cl
Molar mass	252.07 g·mol^{−1}
Appearance	White powder of small prisms
Odor	None
Density	5.7 g/cm^{3} (at 20 °C (68 °F; 293 K))
Boiling point	Sublimes
Solubility in water	1.4 g/L (cold); decomposes if hot
Solubility	Soluble in sodium thiosulfate or ammonium carbonate solution.
Solubility in nitric acid	soluble in warm
Solubility in hydrochloric acid	soluble in warm
Solubility in acetic acid	soluble in warm

Pharmacology
ATC code	D08AK01 (WHO)

Hazards
- GHS labelling
Pictograms	(GHS06: Toxic) (GHS08: Health hazard) (GHS09: Environmental hazard)
Signal word	Danger
Hazard statements	H300+H310+H330, H373, H410
Precautionary statements	P262, P264, P273, P280, P302+P352, P304+P340+P310
Flash point	Non-combustible
Threshold limit value (TLV)	0.025 mg/m^{3} (TWA)
- Lethal dose or concentration (LD, LC)
LD_{50} (median dose)	86 mg/kg (rat, oral); 1325 mg/kg (rat, skin)
LC_{50} (median concentration)	0.051 mg/L (inhalation, 4h, dust/mist)
- NIOSH (US health exposure limits)
PEL (Permissible)	0.1 mg/m^{3} (TWA)
REL (Recommended)	0.1 mg/m^{3} (C, skin, as Hg)
IDLH (Immediate danger)	10 mg/m^{3} (as Hg)

Related compounds
Related compounds	Dimethylmercury; Mercury(II) chloride; Mercury(I) chloride; Methylmercuric dicyanamide; Phenylmercuric borate; Phenylmercury acetate; Phenylmercuric nitrate
- Except where otherwise noted, data are given for materials in their standard state (at 25 °C [77 °F], 100 kPa). verify (what is ?) Infobox references

Mercuric amidochloride is an inorganic compound with the formula Hg(NH_{2})Cl.

== Preparation and properties ==
It arises from the reaction of mercury(II) chloride and ammonia (Calomel reaction), where the resulting mercuric amidochloride is highly insoluble.

It forms white crystals in the shape of small prisms. It has been described as having an earthy, metallic flavor.

At the molecular level, it organizes as a zig-zag one-dimensional polymer (HgNH_{2})_{n} with chloride counterions.

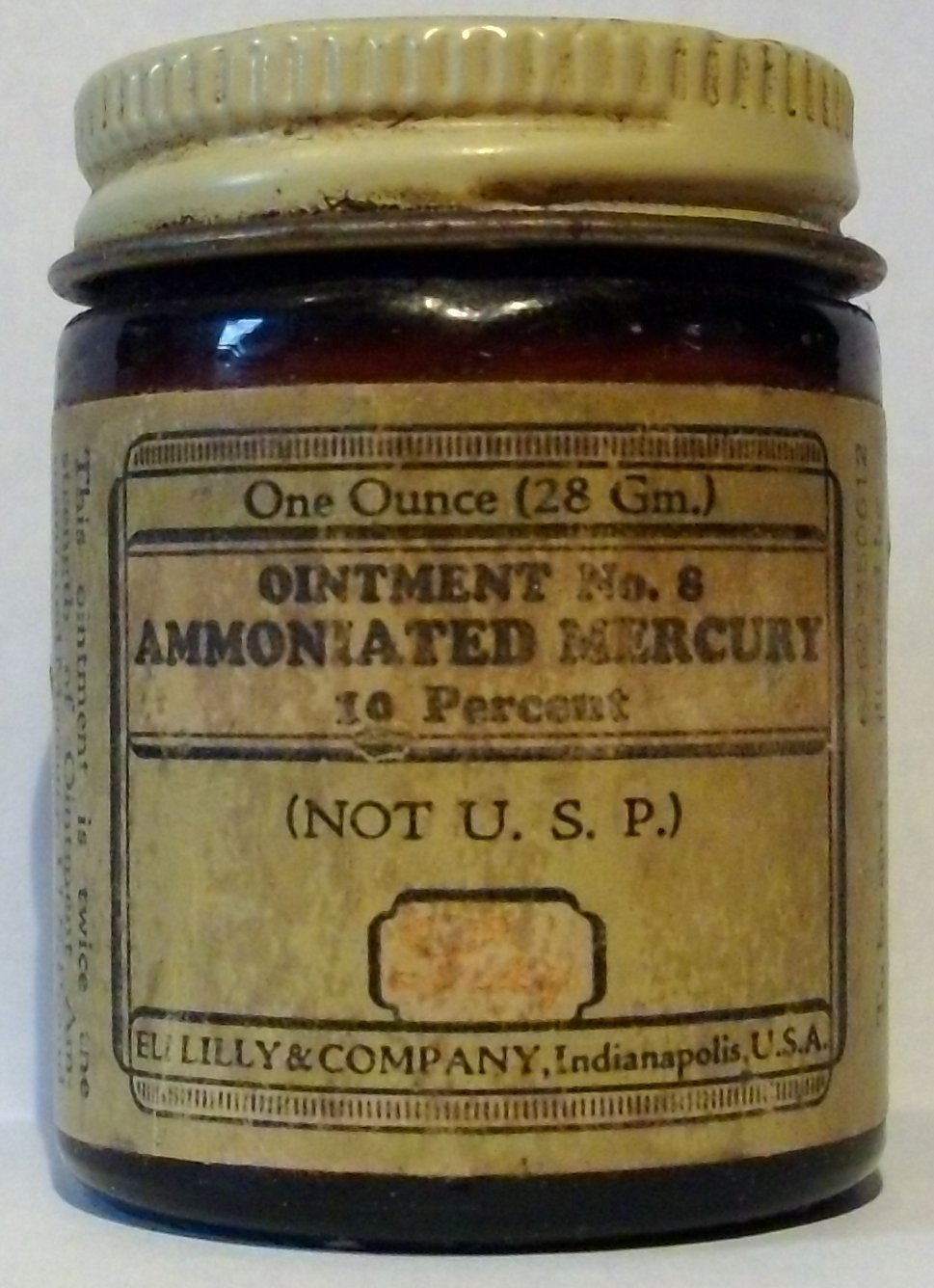
Eli Lilly & Company - Ointment No. 8 - Ammoniated Mercury 10%

It is stable in air, but darkens on exposure to light. It does not melt, even at dull red heat, instead subliming and decomposing to gaseous mercury, hydrogen chloride, and nitrogen oxides. Consequently, sealed containers with this chemical may explode when heated.

The substance is a lethal poison. It is toxic by inhalation, ingestion or dermal absorption. In lesser cases, it may instead cause dermatitis and skin lesions or corrode the mucous membranes.

Addition of base converts it into Millon's base, named after Eugène Millon, which has the formula Hg_{2}(OH)N·xH_{2}O. A variety of related amido and nitrido materials with chloride, bromide, and hydroxide are known.

== Uses ==
Before the toxicity of mercury and its compounds was fully understood, mercuric amidochloride, then known as ammoniated mercury or white precipitate, was used as a topical skin antiseptic, especially for impetigo, dermatomycosis and other certain dermatoses.

It was also used for scaling in psoriasis, to treat pruritus ani, against pinworm and ringworm infection (especially in dogs), against crab louse infestation, against lesions on the body and near eyes, against bumblefoot infection on poultry, and as a disinfectant.

Chronic use of this medication can lead to systemic mercury poisoning.

== See also ==
- Merbromin, also known as "Mercurochrome", another antiseptic mercury compound
- Thiomersal, another antiseptic mercury compound
