= Mitochondrial dicarboxylate carrier =

Mammalian protein found in Homo sapiens

SLC25A10

Identifiers
- Aliases: SLC25A10, DIC, solute carrier family 25 member 10, MTDPS19
- External IDs: OMIM: 606794; MGI: 1353497; GeneCards: SLC25A10

Gene location (Human)
Chr.	Chromosome 17 (human)
Band	17q25.3	Start	81,712,236 bp
Band	17q25.3	End	81,721,016 bp

Gene location (Mouse)
Chr.	Chromosome 11 (mouse)
Band	11|11 E2	Start	120,382,666 bp
Band	11|11 E2	End	120,390,013 bp
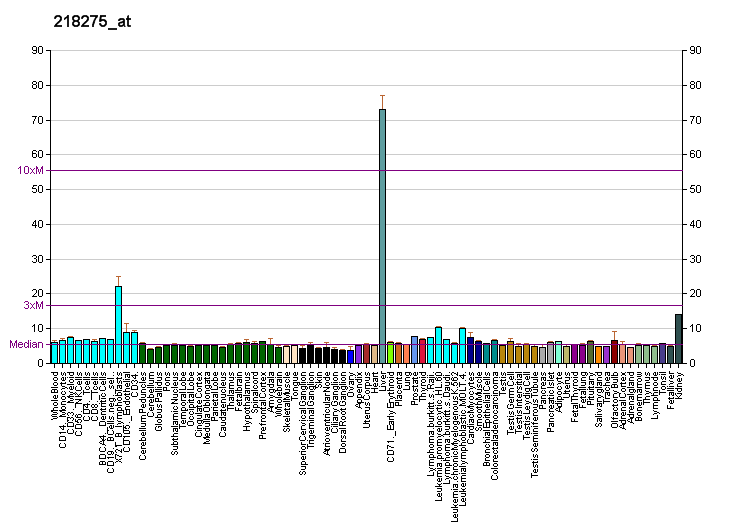
RNA expression pattern
Bgee	Human / Mouse (ortholog); Top expressed in: right lobe of liver; mucosa of transverse colon; right uterine tube; human kidney; duodenum; mucosa of esophagus; body of pancreas; testicle; left testis; salivary gland / Top expressed in: right kidney; yolk sac; human kidney; left lobe of liver; subcutaneous adipose tissue; proximal tubule; epithelium of stomach; duodenum; lacrimal gland; jejunum; More reference expression data
BioGPS	More reference expression data
Gene ontology
Molecular function	dicarboxylic acid transmembrane transporter activity; protein binding; sulfate transmembrane transporter activity; thiosulfate transmembrane transporter activity; oxaloacetate transmembrane transporter activity; malate transmembrane transporter activity; succinate transmembrane transporter activity; antiporter activity; transmembrane transporter activity
Cellular component	membrane; mitochondrial membranes; nucleus; nucleoplasm; mitochondrion; mitochondrial inner membrane; integral component of membrane
Biological process	gluconeogenesis; dicarboxylic acid transport; sulfide oxidation, using sulfide:quinone oxidoreductase; ion transport; mitochondrial transport; sulfate transport; thiosulfate transport; oxaloacetate transport; phosphate ion transmembrane transport; succinate transmembrane transport; malate transmembrane transport; oxaloacetate(2-) transmembrane transport; sulfate transmembrane transport; transport
Sources:Amigo / QuickGO
Orthologs
Databases	NCBI: entry; OMA: entry
Species	Human	Mouse
Entrez	1468	27376
Ensembl	ENSG00000183048	ENSMUSG00000025792
UniProt	Q9UBX3	Q9QZD8
RefSeq (mRNA)	NM_001270888; NM_001270953; NM_012140	NM_013770
RefSeq (protein)	NP_001257817; NP_001257882; NP_036272	NP_038798
Location (UCSC)	Chr 17: 81.71 – 81.72 Mb	Chr 11: 120.38 – 120.39 Mb
PubMed search
- Wikidata
View/Edit Human	View/Edit Mouse

The mitochondrial dicarboxylate carrier (DIC) is an integral membrane protein encoded by the SLC25A10 gene in humans that catalyzes the transport of dicarboxylates such as malonate, malate, and succinate across the inner mitochondrial membrane in exchange for phosphate, sulfate, and thiosulfate by a simultaneous antiport mechanism, thus supplying substrates for the Krebs cycle, gluconeogenesis, urea synthesis, fatty acid synthesis, and sulfur metabolism.

== Structure ==
The SLC25A10 gene is located on the q arm of chromosome 17 in position 25.3 and spans 8,781 base pairs. The gene has 11 exons and produces a 31.3 kDa protein composed of 287 amino acids. Intron 1 of this gene has five short Alu sequences. Mitochondrial dicarboxylate carriers are dimers, each consisting of six transmembrane domains with both the N- and C- terminus exposed to the cytoplasm. Like all mitochondrial carriers, dicarboxylate carriers features a tripartite structure with three repeats of about 100 amino acid residues, each of which contains a conserved sequence motif. These three tandem sequences fold into two anti-parallel transmembrane α-helices linked by hydrophilic sequences.

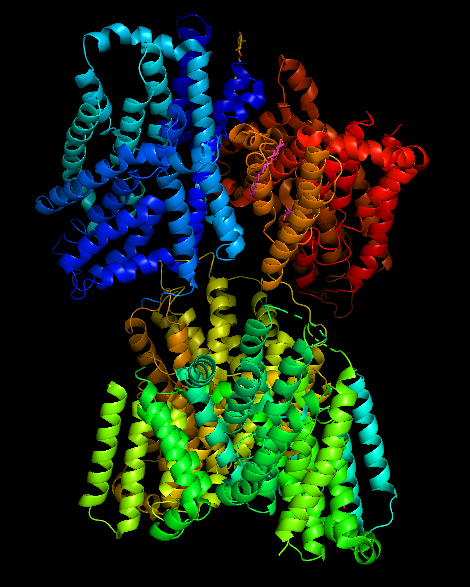
Crystal structure of a bacterial dicarboxylate carrier

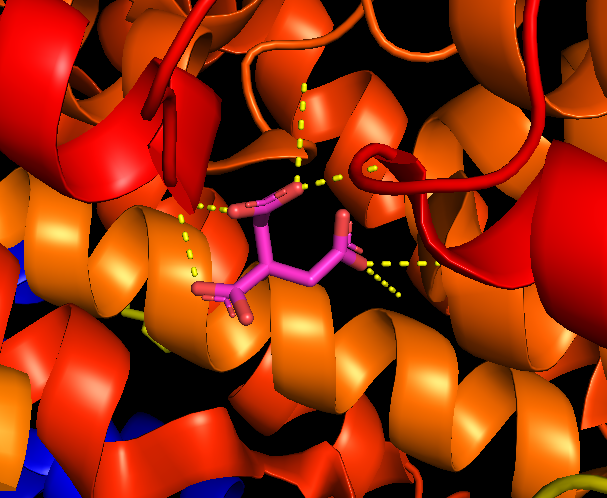
Coordinated dicarboxylate within bacterial dicarboxylate carrier

== Function ==
A crucial function of dicarboxylate carriers is to export malate from the mitochondria in exchange for inorganic phosphate. Dicarboxylate carriers are highly abundant in the adipose tissue and play a central role in supplying cytosolic malate for the citrate transporter, which then exchanges cytosolic malate for mitochondrial citrate to begin fatty acid synthesis. Abundant levels of DIC are also detected in the kidneys and liver, whereas lower levels are found in the lung, spleen, heart, and brain. Dicarboxylate carriers are involved in glucose-stimulated insulin secretion through pyruvate cycling, which mediates NADPH production, and by providing cytosolic malate as a counter-substrate for citrate export. It is also involved in reactive oxygen species (ROS) production through hyperpolarization of mitochondria and increases ROS levels when overexpressed. Furthermore, dicarboxylate carriers are crucial for cellular respiration, and inhibition of DIC impairs complex I activity in mitochondria.

== Regulation ==
Insulin causes a dramatic (approximately 80%) reduction of DIC expression in mice, whereas free fatty acids induces DIC expression. Cold exposure, which increases energy expenditure and decreases fatty acid biosynthesis, resulted in a significant (approximately 50%) reduction of DIC expression. DIC is inhibited by some dicarboxylate analogues, such as butylmalonate, as well as bathophenanthroline and thiol reagents such as Mersalyl and p-hydroxymercuribenzoate. The activity of dicarboxylate carriers has also been found to be upregulated in plants in response to stress. The rate of malonate uptake is inhibited by 2-oxoglutarate and unaffected by citrate, whereas the rates of succinate and malate uptake are inhibited by both 2-oxoglutarate and citrate.

== Disease relevance ==
Suppression of SLC25A10 down-regulated fatty acid synthesis in mice, resulting in decreased lipid accumulation in adipocytes. Additionally, knockout of SLC25A10 inhibited insulin-stimulated lipogenesis in adipocytes. These findings presents a possible target for anti-obesity treatments. It is also upregulated in tumors, which is likely because it regulates energy metabolism and redox homeostasis, both of which are frequently altered in tumor cells. In non-small cell lung cancer (NSCLC) cells, inhibition of SLC25A10 was found to increase the sensitivity to traditional anticancer drugs, and thus may present a potential target for anti-cancer strategies. Furthermore, overexpression of dicarboxylate carriers in renal proximal tubular cells has been found to cause a reversion to a non-diabetic state and protect cells from oxidative injury. This finding supports the dicarboxylate carriers as a potential therapeutic target to correct underlying metabolic disturbances in diabetic nephropathy.

== Interactions ==
This protein has binary interactions with NOTCH2NL, KRTAP5-9, KRTAP4-2, KRTAP10-8, MDFI, and KRT40.

== See also ==
- Solute carrier family
