= Merbromin =

Organomercuric antiseptic for external use on minor cuts

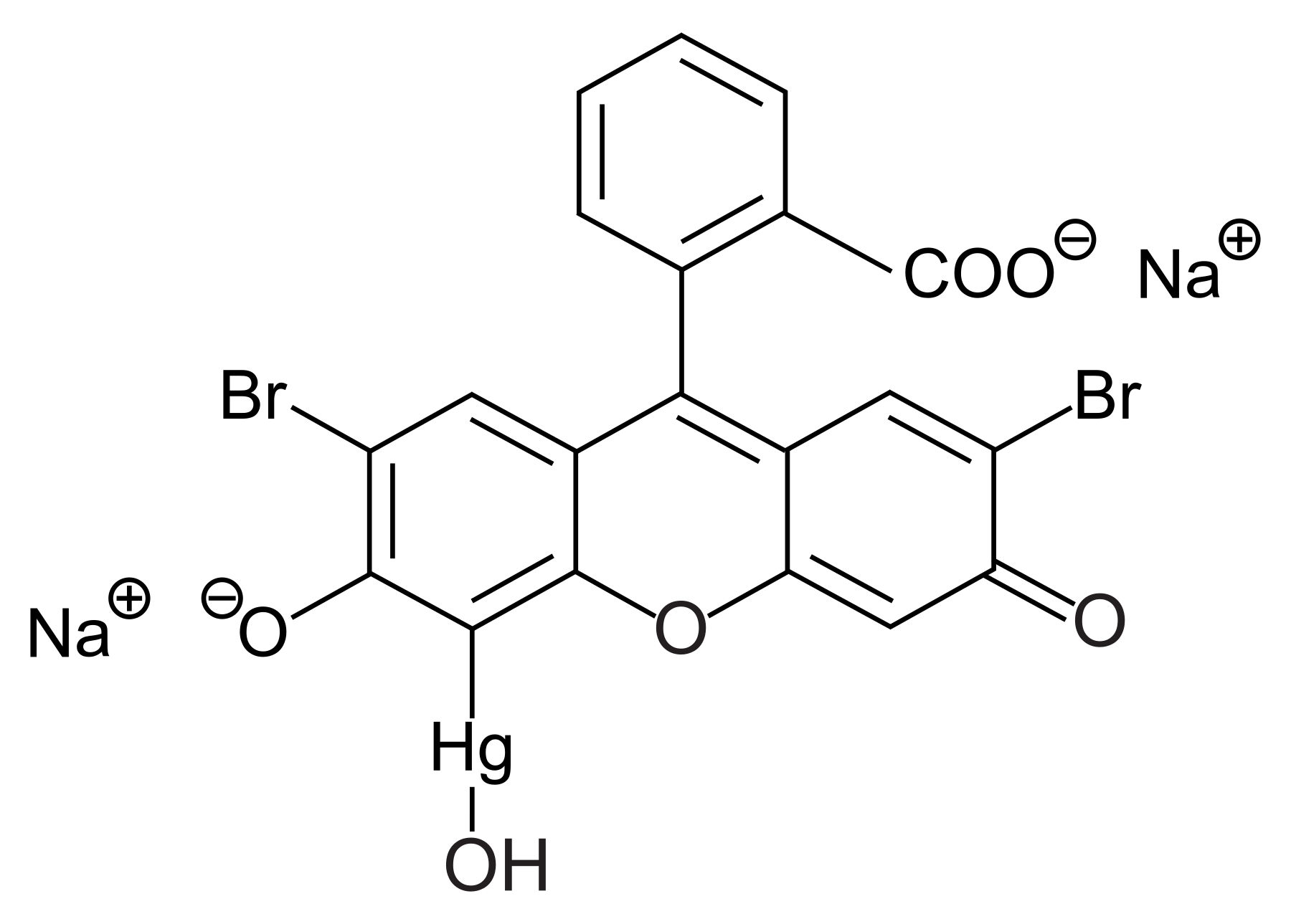

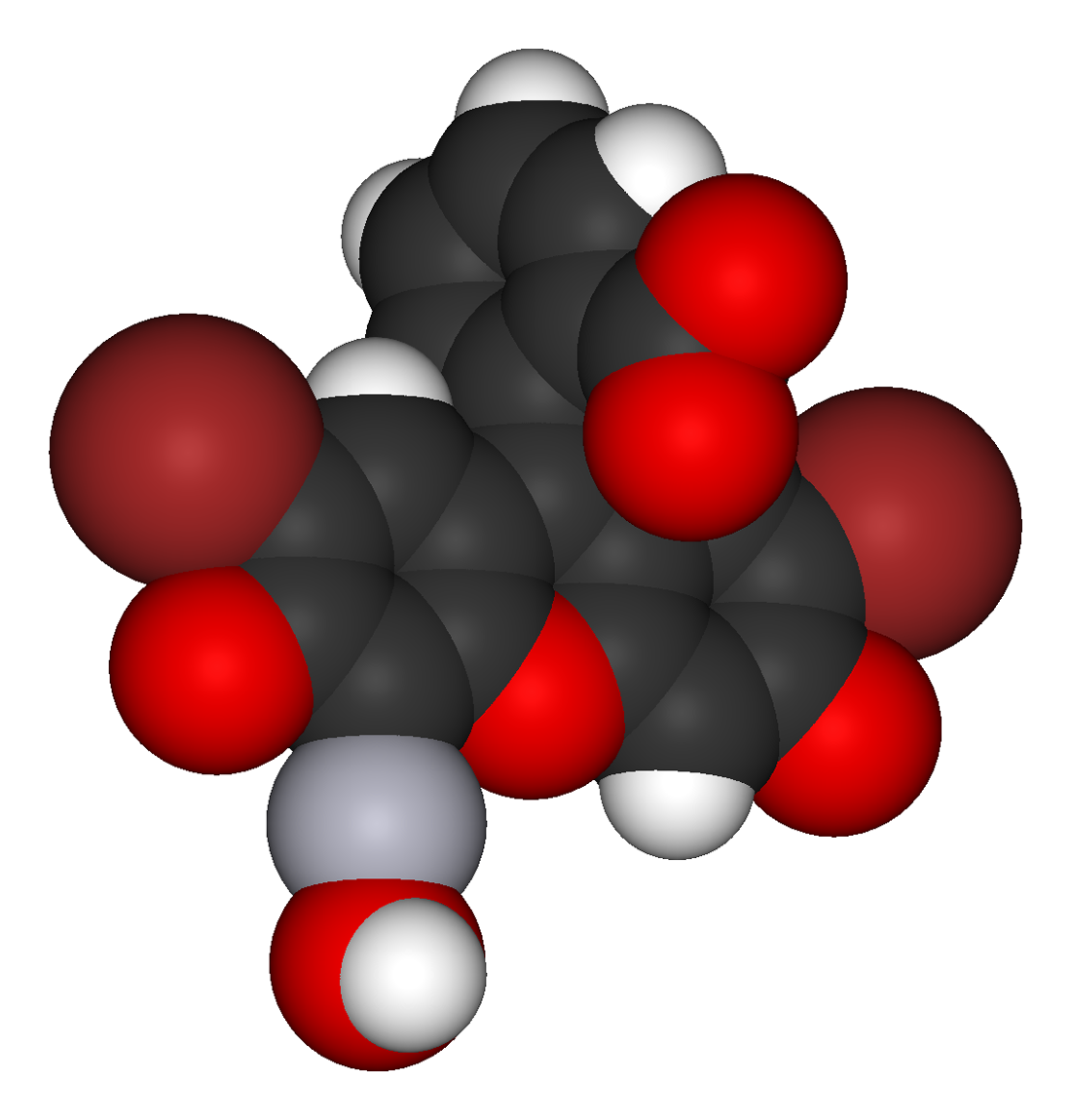

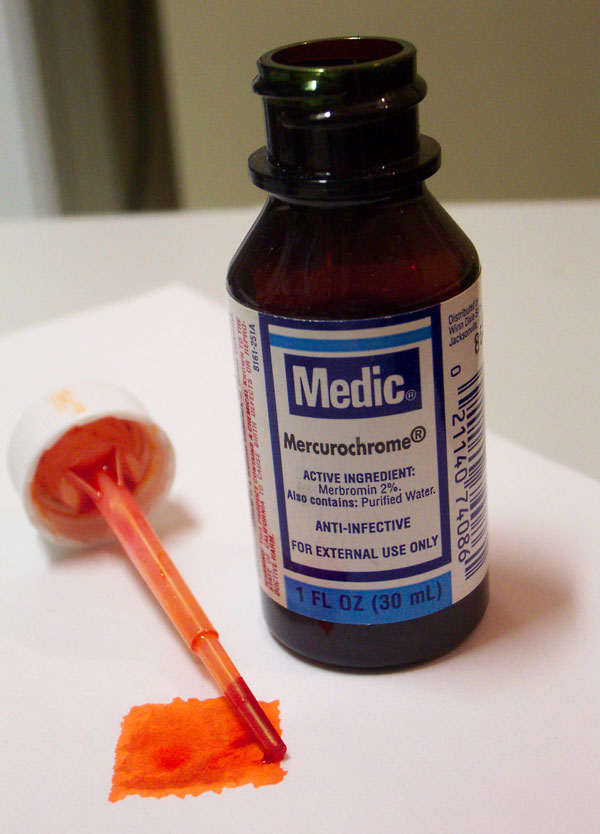

Names
- IUPAC name dibromohydroxymercurifluorescein

Identifiers
CAS Number	129-16-8
3D model (JSmol)	Interactive image
ChEBI	CHEBI:6763
ChEMBL	ChEMBL2097077
ChemSpider	10808965
DrugBank	DB13392
ECHA InfoCard	100.004.486
EC Number	204-933-6
KEGG	D00861
PubChem CID	8505
UNII	M0T18YH28D
CompTox Dashboard (EPA)	DTXSID0045545
- InChI: InChI=1S/C20H9Br2O5.Hg.2Na.H2O/c21-13-5-11-17(7-15(13)23)27-18-8-16(24)14(22)6-12(18)19(11)9-3-1-2-4-10(9)20(25)26;;;;/h1-7,24H,(H,25,26);;;;1H2/q;3*+1;/p-3 Key: SQFDQLBYJKFDDO-UHFFFAOYSA-K; InChI=1/C20H9Br2O5.Hg.2Na.H2O/c21-13-5-11-17(7-15(13)23)27-18-8-16(24)14(22)6-12(18)19(11)9-3-1-2-4-10(9)20(25)26;;;;/h1-7,24H,(H,25,26);;;;1H2/q;3*+1;/p-3/rC20H10Br2HgO6.2Na/c21-12-5-10-15(7-14(12)24)29-19-11(6-13(22)18(25)17(19)23-28)16(10)8-3-1-2-4-9(8)20(26)27;;/h1-7,25,28H,(H,26,27);;/q;2*+1/p-2 Key: SQFDQLBYJKFDDO-ISOIBTJNAR
- SMILES: [Na+].[Na+].[O-]C(=O)c4ccccc4C=1c3cc(Br)c([O-])c([Hg]O)c3O/C/2=C/C(=O)C(/Br)=C\C=1\2

Properties
Chemical formula	C_{20}H_{8}Br_{2}HgNa_{2}O_{6}
Molar mass	750.658 g·mol^{−1}
Appearance	dark red liquid

Pharmacology
ATC code	D08AK04 (WHO)

Hazards
- Occupational safety and health (OHS/OSH)
Main hazards	Toxic, dangerous for the environment
- GHS labelling
Pictograms	(GHS06: Toxic) (GHS08: Health hazard) (GHS09: Environmental hazard)
Signal word	Danger
Hazard statements	H300, H310, H330, H373, H410
Precautionary statements	P260, P264, P273, P280, P284, P301+P310
- Except where otherwise noted, data are given for materials in their standard state (at 25 °C [77 °F], 100 kPa). verify (what is ?) Infobox references

Merbromin (marketed as Mercurochrome, Merbromine, Mercurocol, Sodium mercurescein, Asceptichrome, Supercrome, Brocasept and Cinfacromin) is an organomercuric disodium salt compound used as a topical antiseptic for minor cuts and scrapes and as a biological dye. While readily available in most countries, it is no longer sold in much of the West, including Australia, Switzerland, Brazil, France, Iran, Germany, Denmark, or the United States, due to its mercury content.

== Uses ==
Merbromin's best-known use is as a topical antiseptic to treat minor wounds, burns, and scratches. Merbromin is also antimicrobial. It is also used in the antisepsis of the umbilical cord, and the antisepsis of wounds with inhibited scar formation, such as neuropathic ulcers and diabetic foot sores. When applied on a wound, it stains the skin a distinctive carmine red, which can persist through repeated washings. Due to its persistence and to its lethality to bacteria, merbromin is useful on infections of the fingernail or toenail.

In 1998, the U.S. Food and Drug Administration reclassified merbromin from "generally recognized as safe" to "untested", due to a lack of recent studies or updated supporting information. Consequently, its use in the United States has been superseded by other agents (e.g., povidone iodine, benzalkonium chloride, chloroxylenol).

== Synthesis ==
Merbromin is synthesized by combining dibromofluorescein with mercuric acetate and sodium hydroxide or, alternatively, through action of the mercuric acetate upon (or combining with) sodium dibromofluorescein. Because of its anionic character, it is chemically incompatible with acids, the majority of alkaloid salts and most local anesthetics.

== Mercurochrome ==
Merbromin is sold under the trade name Mercurochrome (in which the suffix "-chrome" denotes "color"). The name is also commonly used for over-the-counter antiseptic solutions consisting of merbromin (typically at 2% concentration) dissolved in either ethyl alcohol (tincture) or water (aqueous).

Its antiseptic qualities were discovered in 1918 by Hugh H. Young, a physician at Johns Hopkins Hospital. The chemical soon became popular among parents and physicians for everyday antiseptic uses, in part because the dye component made it easy to see where the antiseptic had been applied.

On 19 October 1998, citing potential for mercury poisoning, the US Food and Drug Administration (FDA) reclassified merbromin from "generally recognized as safe" to "untested," effectively halting its distribution within the United States. Sales were subsequently halted in Brazil (2001), Germany (2003), France (2006) and Australia (2025). It remains available in some other countries.

Within the United States, products such as Humco Mercuroclear ("Aqueous solution of benzalkonium chloride and lidocaine hydrochloride") play on the brand recognition history of Mercurochrome but substitute other ingredients with similar properties. In Canada, Jean Coutu Group markets a chlorhexidine solution under the name Mercurochrome.

== See also ==
- Nitromersol, an organomercury antiseptic and antifungal agent
- Phenyl mercuric nitrate
- Thiomersal, also known as Thimerosal or Merthiolate
