= C7H6O2S =

The molecular formula C_{7}H_{6}O_{2}S may refer to:

- 4-Mercaptobenzoic acid
- Thiosalicylic acid
