= C8H6S =

The molecular formula C_{8}H_{6}S (molar mass: 134.20 g/mol, exact mass: 134.0190 u) may refer to:

- Benzo[c]thiophene
- Benzothiophene
