= 4-Aminophenylmercuric acetate =

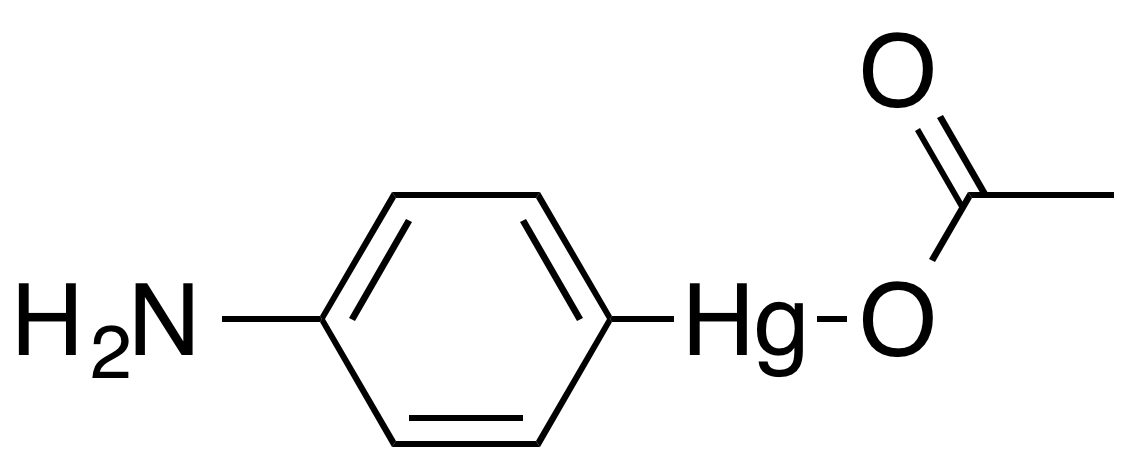

Names
- IUPAC name Acetato(4-aminophenyl)mercury

Identifiers
CAS Number	6283-24-5
3D model (JSmol)	Interactive image
Beilstein Reference	3664749
ChemSpider	8082118
ECHA InfoCard	100.025.907
EC Number	228-497-1
PubChem CID	16682983
CompTox Dashboard (EPA)	DTXSID8064197
- InChI: InChI=1S/C6H6N.C2H4O2.Hg/c7-6-4-2-1-3-5-6;1-2(3)4;/h2-5H,7H2;1H3,(H,3,4);/q;;+1/p-1 Key: RXSUFCOOZSGWSW-UHFFFAOYSA-M
- SMILES: CC(=O)O[Hg]C1=CC=C(C=C1)N

Properties
Chemical formula	C_{8}H_{9}HgNO_{2}
Molar mass	351.757 g·mol^{−1}
Appearance	off-white powder
Solubility in water	5 mM
Solubility	DMSO

Hazards
- GHS labelling
Pictograms	(GHS06: Toxic) (GHS08: Health hazard) (GHS09: Environmental hazard)
Signal word	Danger
Hazard statements	H300, H310, H330, H373, H410
Precautionary statements	P260, P262, P264, P270, P271, P273, P280, P284, P301+P310, P302+P350, P304+P340, P310, P314, P320, P321, P330, P361, P363, P391, P403+P233, P405, P501
- Except where otherwise noted, data are given for materials in their standard state (at 25 °C [77 °F], 100 kPa). Infobox references

4-Aminophenylmercuric acetate (CH_{3}CO_{2}HgC_{6}H_{4}NH_{2}, also known as 4-(Acetoxymercurio)aniline or APMA), is an organomercurial compound and thiol-blocking reagent used in experimental biology and chemistry to activate matrix metalloproteinases and collagenase proteolytic enzymes. The material is highly toxic.

== Properties ==
APMA has a molecular weight of 351.8 g/mol and appears as a white powder with a slight yellowish cast. Its melting temperature is 163–165 °C. APMA is soluble in water to concentrations as high as 5 mM, and in DMSO to concentrations of 10 M or more. In 100% acetic acid, an APMA solution of 50 mg/mL is a light translucent yellow.

== Protein modification ==
APMA is known to activate matrix metalloproteinase enzymes and collagenase. APMA activates proteolytic enzymes by reacting with cysteines at the amino terminal domains that bind zinc, near the location of the enzyme active site.

== Toxicity ==
APMA and APMA vapors are highly toxic or fatal in contact with skin, or if inhaled or swallowed.

== See also ==
- 4-Chloromercuribenzoic acid - an organomercury compound that is used as a protease inhibitor
- Phenylmercury acetate - a structurally related organomercury compound historically used as a preservative in paints
