= APMA (disambiguation) =

APMA or Apma may refer to:

- All Pakistan Minorities Alliance, founded by Shahbaz Bhatti
- American Podiatric Medical Association
- American Preventive Medical Association, former name of the Alliance for Natural Health USA
- Apma language, a language of Vanuatu
- 4-Aminophenylmercuric acetate
- Alternative Press Music Awards
- Asian Pop Music Awards

== See also ==
- Ap Ma language, also known as the Kambot language, a language of New Guinea
