= Mersalyl =

Organomercury compound once used diuretic

Names
- IUPAC name (3-{[2-(Carboxymethoxy)benzoyl]amino}-2-methoxypropyl)(hydroxy)mercury
- Other names Mersalyl acid, salyrganic acid

Identifiers
CAS Number	486-67-9
3D model (JSmol)	Interactive image
ChEMBL	ChEMBL1201330
ChemSpider	11337655
ECHA InfoCard	100.006.943
IUPHAR/BPS	5331
PubChem CID	443130
UNII	7RDI07K19U
CompTox Dashboard (EPA)	DTXSID101334269 DTXSID3046902, DTXSID101334269
- InChI: InChI=1S/C13H16NO5.Hg.H2O/c1-9(18-2)7-14-13(17)10-5-3-4-6-11(10)19-8-12(15)16;;/h3-6,9H,1,7-8H2,2H3,(H,14,17)(H,15,16);;1H2/q;+1;/p-1 Key: HQRSUIDICNOLPX-UHFFFAOYSA-M; InChI=1/C13H16NO5.Hg.H2O/c1-9(18-2)7-14-13(17)10-5-3-4-6-11(10)19-8-12(15)16;;/h3-6,9H,1,7-8H2,2H3,(H,14,17)(H,15,16);;1H2/q;+1;/p-1/rC13H17HgNO6/c1-20-9(6-14-19)7-15-13(18)10-4-2-3-5-11(10)21-8-12(16)17/h2-5,9,19H,6-8H2,1H3,(H,15,18)(H,16,17) Key: HQRSUIDICNOLPX-SCJHNVIKAK
- SMILES: O[Hg]CC(OC)CNC(=O)c1ccccc1OCC(O)=O

Properties
Chemical formula	C_{13}H_{18}HgNO_{6}
Molar mass	484.87512 g/mol

Pharmacology
ATC code	C03BC01 (WHO)
- Except where otherwise noted, data are given for materials in their standard state (at 25 °C [77 °F], 100 kPa). verify (what is ?) Infobox references

Mersalyl (Mersal) is an organomercury compound and mercurial diuretic. It is only rarely used as a drug, having been superseded by thiazides and loop diuretics that are less toxic because they do not contain mercury. It features a Hg(II) centre. Mersalyl was originally adapted from calomel (Hg_{2}Cl_{2}), a diuretic discovered by Paracelsus.

== See also ==
- Thiomersal – Organomercury antiseptic and antifungal agent
- Nitromersol – Organomercury antiseptic and antifungal agent
