= Tetrakis(acetoxymercuri)methane =

Names
- Other names Tetrakis(acetoxymercurio)methane

Identifiers
CAS Number	25201-30-3
3D model (JSmol)	Interactive image
ChemSpider	17615652
PubChem CID	16683093
UNII	VCG6X60HJW
CompTox Dashboard (EPA)	DTXSID60179867
- InChI: InChI=1S/4C2H4O2.C.4Hg/c4*1-2(3)4;;;;;/h4*1H3,(H,3,4);;;;;/q;;;;;4*+1/p-4 Key: FUFKDCOYEVSHMN-UHFFFAOYSA-J
- SMILES: CC(=O)O[Hg]C([Hg]OC(=O)C)([Hg]OC(=O)C)[Hg]OC(=O)C

Properties
Chemical formula	C_{9}H_{12}Hg_{4}O_{8}
Molar mass	1050.555 g·mol^{−1}
Appearance	white solid
Density	3.71 g/cm^{3}
Melting point	265–285 °C (509–545 °F; 538–558 K)
- Except where otherwise noted, data are given for materials in their standard state (at 25 °C [77 °F], 100 kPa). Infobox references

Tetrakis(acetoxymercuri)methane is an organomercury compound with the formula C(HgO_{2}CCH_{3})_{4}. It was obtained in the investigation of Hofmann's base ([CHg_{4}O(OH_{2})](OH)_{2}), an ill-defined yellowish material produced by treatment of mercuric oxide with base in ethanol. Hofmann's base was once thought to have the formula C_{2}Hg_{6}(OH)_{2}. Eventually it was found to dissolve in carboxylic acids (RCO_{2}H) to give colorless derivatives of the type C(HgO_{2}CR)_{4}. Several tetramercurimethane derivatives have now been characterized by X-ray crystallography.

Independent of studies on Hofmann's base, tetrakis(acetoxymercuri)methane was first prepared by reaction of the tetraborylmethane C(B(OCH_{3})_{2})_{4} with mercuric acetate.
