= Mercury(I) acetate =

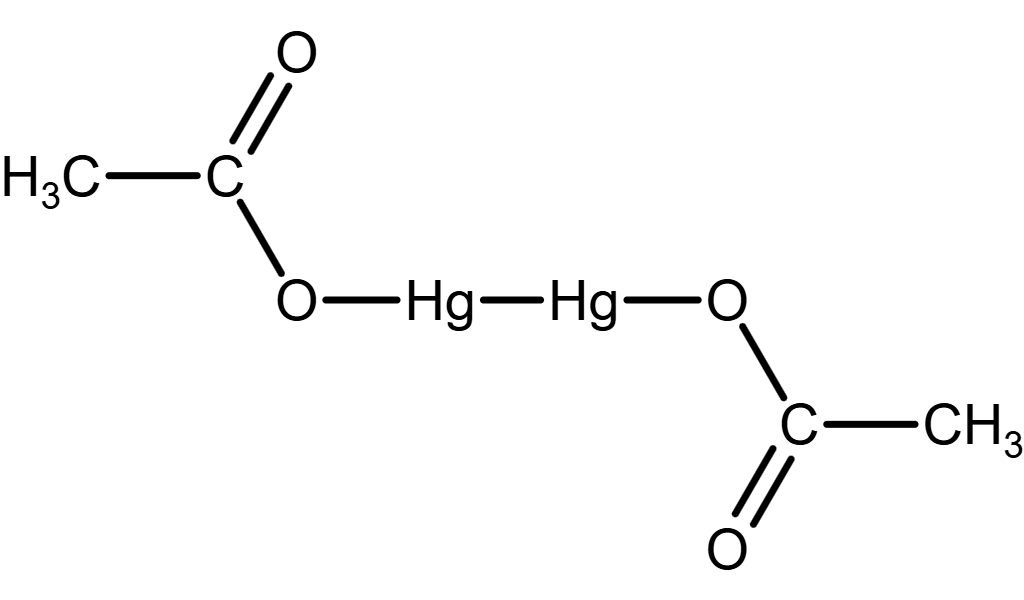

Names
- Other names: Mercurous acetate

Identifiers
CAS Number	631-60-7
3D model (JSmol)	Interactive image
ChemSpider	55127
EC Number	211-161-3
PubChem CID	61181
UNII	DTW66XA971
CompTox Dashboard (EPA)	DTXSID30212432
- InChI: InChI=1S/2C2H4O2.2Hg/c2*1-2(3)4;;/h2*1H3,(H,3,4);;/q;;2*+1/p-2 Key: LTLCGIKWGSDBMN-UHFFFAOYSA-L
- SMILES: [Hg]([Hg]OC(C)=O)OC(C)=O

Properties
Chemical formula	(CH_{3}COO)_{2}Hg_{2}
Molar mass	519.272 g·mol^{−1}
Appearance	Colorless monoclinic crystals
Density	4.763 g/cm^{3}
Melting point	178–180 °C (352–356 °F; 451–453 K)
Solubility in water	0.75 g/100mL (12 °C (54 °F))
Solubility	Insoluble in ethanol, diethyl ether, soluble in dilute nitric acid. Soluble in dilute acetic acid.

Hazards
- Occupational safety and health (OHS/OSH)
Main hazards	Highly toxic
- GHS labelling
Pictograms	(GHS06: Toxic) (GHS07: Exclamation mark) (GHS08: Health hazard)
Signal word	Danger
Hazard statements	H301, H311, H316, H317, H341, H361, H370, H372
Precautionary statements	P203, P260, P262, P264, P270, P272, P280, P301+P316, P302+P352, P308+P316, P316, P318, P319, P321, P330, P333+P317, P361+P364, P362+P364, P405, P501
NFPA 704 (fire diamond)	4 0 0
Flash point	Not flammable
- Lethal dose or concentration (LD, LC)
LD_{50} (median dose)	960 mg/kg (rat, skin); 150 mg/kg (mouse, oral); 10.2 mg/kg (mouse, intraperitoneal); 175 mg/kg (rat, oral)

Related compounds
Related compounds	Mercury(II) acetate
- Except where otherwise noted, data are given for materials in their standard state (at 25 °C [77 °F], 100 kPa). Infobox references

Mercury(I) acetate, also known as mercurous acetate, is a chemical compound with the chemical formula (CH_{3}COO)_{2}Hg_{2}. It is a colorless crystalline solid in a form of scales or plates.

== Synthesis ==
Mercury(I) acetate is synthesized by reaction between mercury(I) nitrate and sodium acetate in a water solution of nitric acid.

Hg_{2}(NO_{3})_{2} + 2 CH_{3}COONa → (CH_{3}COO)_{2}Hg_{2} + 2 NaNO_{3}

== Structure ==
Mercury(I) actetate crystallizes as centrosymmetric dimers, with the molecular connectivity H_{3}C−C(=O)−O−Hg−Hg−O−C(=O)−CH_{3}, with Hg-Hg distance of 252.02 pm and Hg-O distance of 215.2 pm. The dimers are connected into infinite ribbons by long, weaker Hg-O bonds (Hg-O distance is 268.02 pm). There are no strong intermolecular forces between the ribbons. Crystals of mercury(I) actetate have a monoclinic unit-cell with the parameters of a = 518 pm, b = 596 pm, c = 1216 pm and β = 100.05°, and contains 2 formula units.

== Reactions ==
Mercury(I) actetate decomposes in boiling water and by light to mercury and mercury(II) acetate.

(CH_{3}COO)_{2}Hg_{2} → Hg + (CH_{3}COO)_{2}Hg

Mercury(I) acetate reacts with bromine and iodine to form mercury(II) acetate bromide CH_{3}COOHgBr and mercury(II) acetate iodide CH_{3}COOHgI respectively.

(CH_{3}COO)_{2}Hg_{2} + Br_{2} → 2 CH_{3}COOHgBr

== Hazards ==
Mercury(I) acetate is a poison. When heated to decomposition, it emits toxic vapors of mercury. Causes damage to organs through prolonged or repeated exposure.
