= Thioindigo =

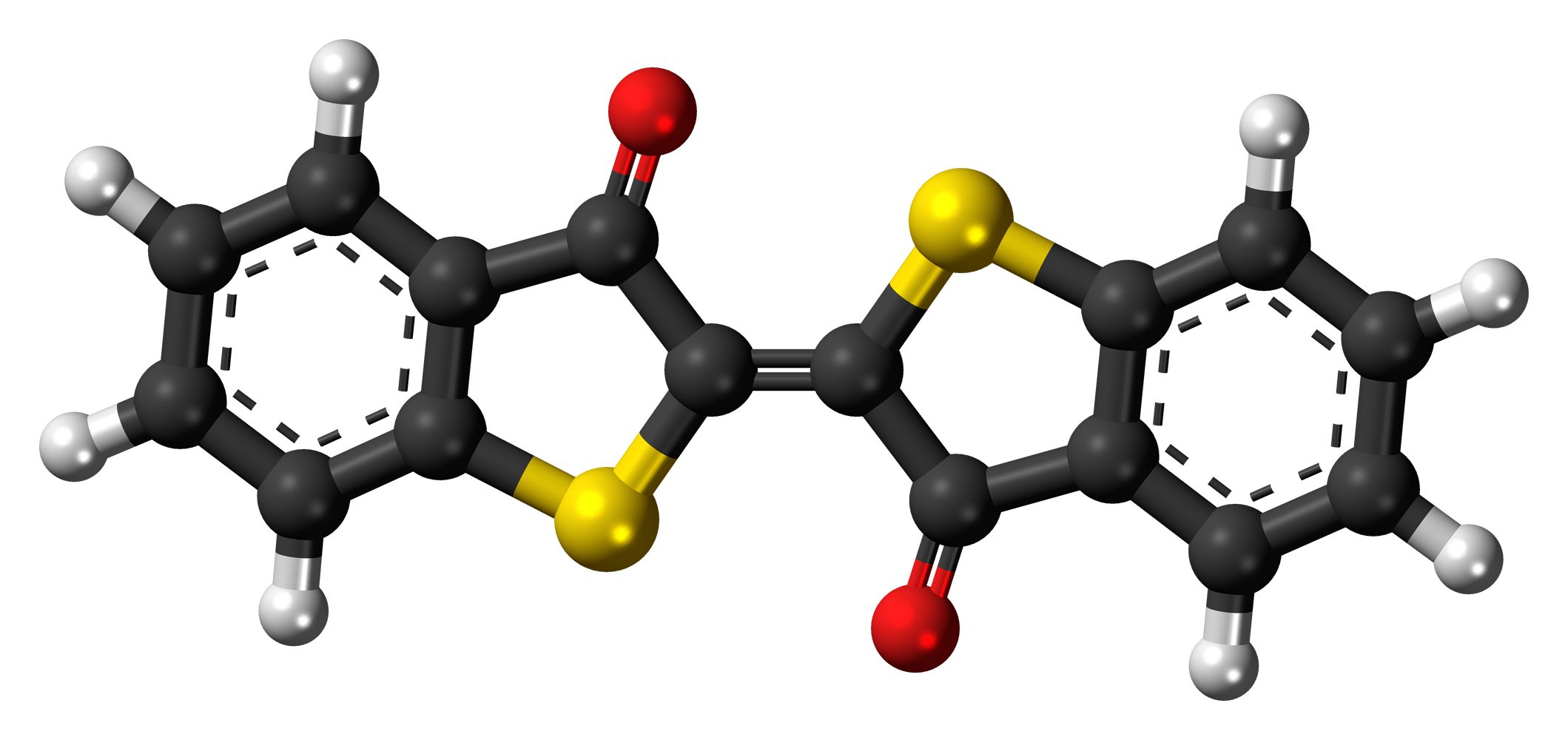

Names
- Preferred IUPAC name [2(2′)E]-3H,3′H-[2,2′-Bi-1-benzothiophenylidene]-3,3′-dione
- Other names DyStar, C.I. Vat Red 41, C.I. 73 300

Identifiers
CAS Number	522-75-8
3D model (JSmol)	Interactive image
ChemSpider	4527286
ECHA InfoCard	100.007.580
PubChem CID	3033973
UNII	V993X7635Y
CompTox Dashboard (EPA)	DTXSID8060169
- InChI: InChI=1S/C16H8O2S2/c17-13-9-5-1-3-7-11(9)19-15(13)16-14(18)10-6-2-4-8-12(10)20-16/h1-8H/b16-15+ Key: JOUDBUYBGJYFFP-FOCLMDBBSA-N; InChI=1/C16H8O2S2/c17-13-9-5-1-3-7-11(9)19-15(13)16-14(18)10-6-2-4-8-12(10)20-16/h1-8H/b16-15+ Key: JOUDBUYBGJYFFP-FOCLMDBBBL
- SMILES: O=C3c4ccccc4S/C3=C2/Sc1ccccc1C2=O

Properties
Chemical formula	C_{16}H_{8}O_{2}S_{2}
Molar mass	296.36 g·mol^{−1}
Appearance	Red solid
Melting point	280 °C (536 °F; 553 K)
Solubility in water	Insoluble
Solubility in ethanol, xylene	Soluble
- Except where otherwise noted, data are given for materials in their standard state (at 25 °C [77 °F], 100 kPa). verify (what is ?) Infobox references

Thioindigo is an organosulfur compound that is used to dye polyester fabric. A synthetic dye, thioindigo is related to the plant-derived dye indigo, replacing two NH groups with two sulfur atoms to create a shade of pink.

Thioindigo is generated by the alkylation of the sulfur in thiosalicylic acid with chloroacetic acid. The resulting thioether cyclizes to 2-hydroxythianaphthene, which is easily converted to thioindigo. The related compound 4,7,4',7'-tetrachlorothioindigo, also a commercially important dye (Pigment Red 88), can be prepared by chlorination of thioindigo.
