= Antitranspirant =

Antitranspirants are compounds applied to the leaves of plants to reduce transpiration. They are used on Christmas trees, on cut flowers, on newly transplanted shrubs, and in other applications to preserve and protect plants from drying out too quickly. They have also been used to protect leaves from salt burn and fungal diseases.

They block the active excretion of hydrogen cation from the guard cells. Due to presence of carbon dioxide, a rapid acidification of cytoplasm takes place leading to stomatal closure. Milbarrow (1974) has described the formation of these chemicals in the chloroplast. It moves to the stomata, where it is responsible for checking the intake of Potassium ion or induces loss of potassium ion from the guard cells.

Antitranspirants are of two types: metabolic inhibitors and film-forming antitranspirants.

Metabolic inhibitors reduce the stomatal opening and increase the leaf resistance to water vapour diffusion without affecting carbon dioxide uptake. Examples include phenylmercury acetate, abscisic acid (ABA), and aspirin.

Film-forming antitranspirants form a colorless film on the leaf surface that allows diffusion of gases but not of water vapour. Examples include silicone oil, waxes.
