= 4-Mercaptobenzoic acid =

Names
- Preferred IUPAC name 4-Sulfanylbenzoic acid

Identifiers
CAS Number	1074-36-8
3D model (JSmol)	Interactive image
ChEMBL	ChEMBL98938
ChemSpider	86425
ECHA InfoCard	100.121.577
EC Number	600-825-1
PubChem CID	95738
CompTox Dashboard (EPA)	DTXSID40148036
- InChI: InChI=1S/C7H6O2S/c8-7(9)5-1-3-6(10)4-2-5/h1-4,10H,(H,8,9) Key: LMJXSOYPAOSIPZ-UHFFFAOYSA-N
- SMILES: C1=CC(=CC=C1C(=O)O)S

Properties
Chemical formula	C_{7}H_{6}O_{2}S
Molar mass	154.18 g·mol^{−1}
Melting point	215–224 °C (419–435 °F; 488–497 K)

Hazards
- GHS labelling
Pictograms	(GHS07: Exclamation mark)
Signal word	Warning
Hazard statements	H315, H319, H335
Precautionary statements	P261, P264, P271, P280, P302+P352, P305+P351+P338

Related compounds
Related compounds	2-mercaptobenzoic acid; 3-mercaptobenzoic acid
- Except where otherwise noted, data are given for materials in their standard state (at 25 °C [77 °F], 100 kPa). Infobox references

4-Mercaptobenzoic acid (p-mercaptobenzoic acid, p-MBA) is an organosulfur compound with the formula para-C_{6}H_{4}(−SH)(−COOH). It is used as a ligand in thiolate-protected gold cluster compounds, such as Au_{102}(p-MBA)_{44}.

== See also ==
- Gold cluster
