= Benzo(c)thiophene =

Chemical compound

Benzo[c]thiophene
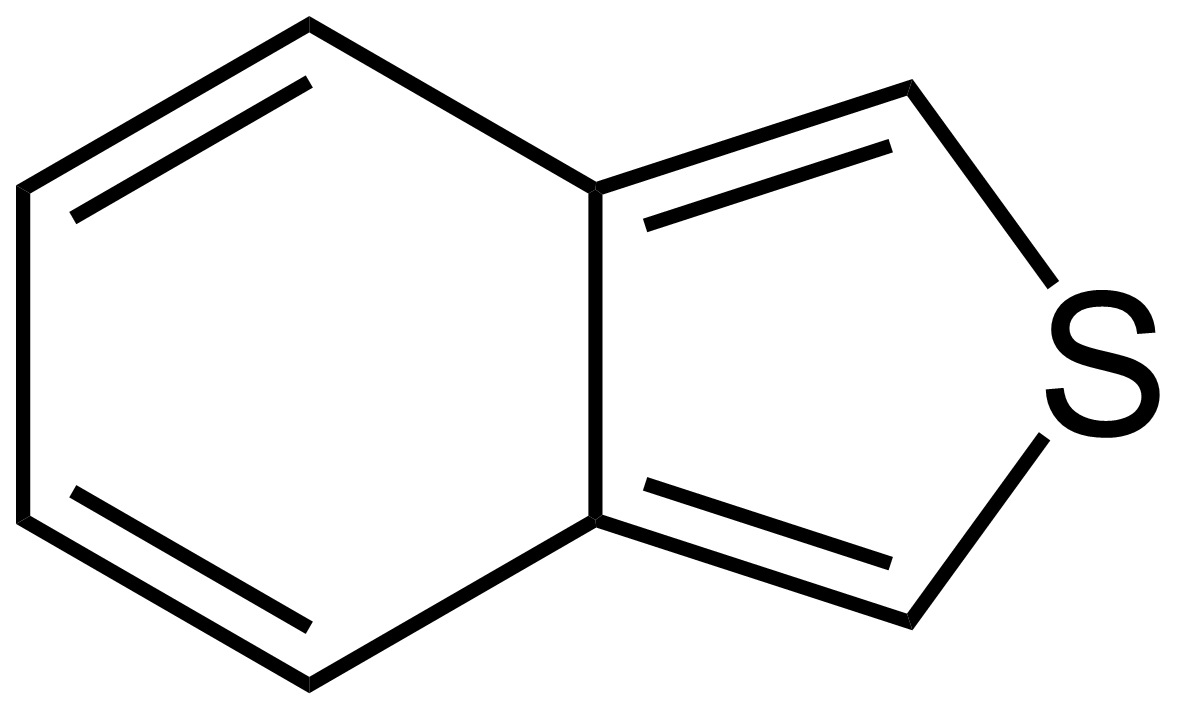

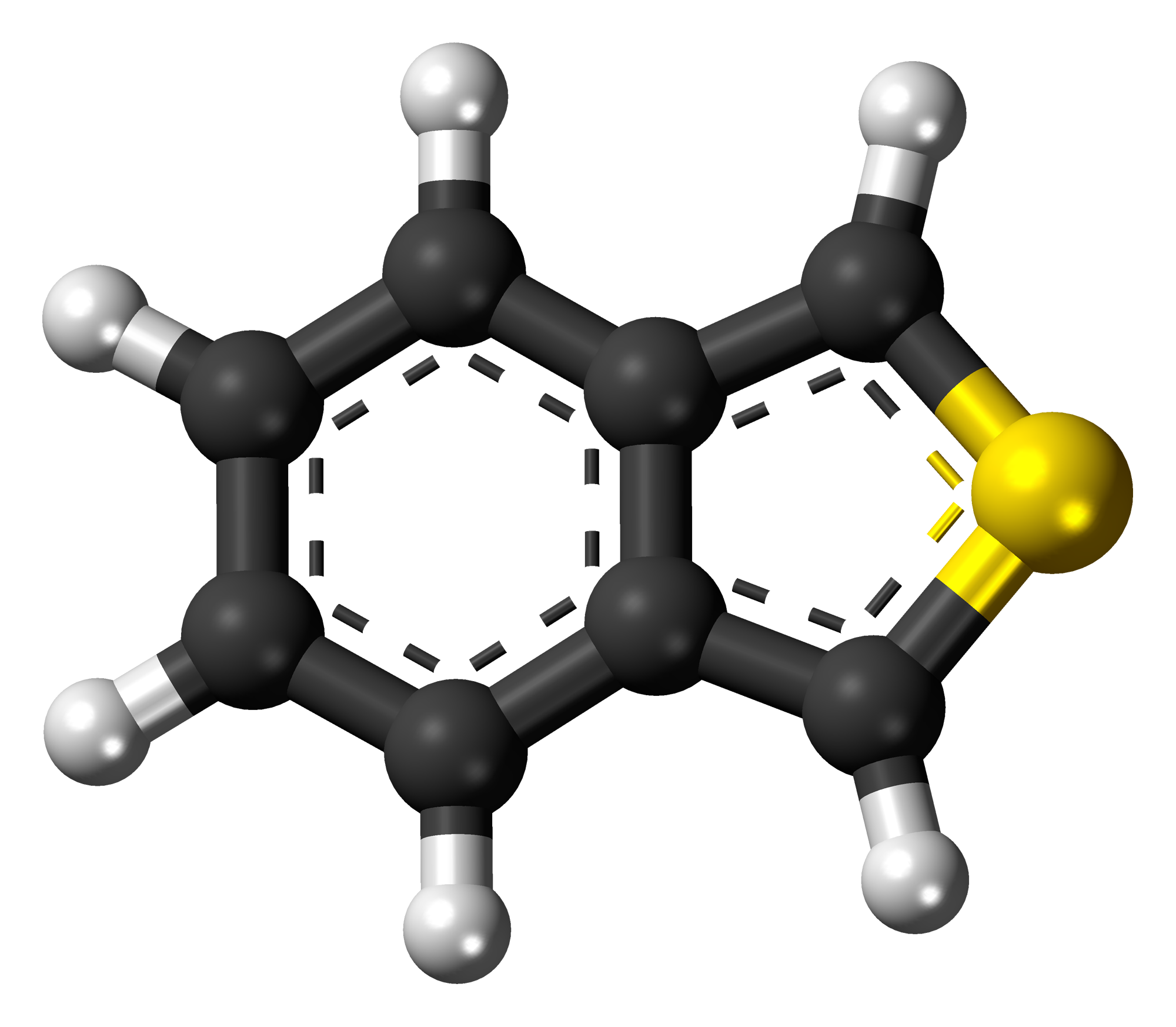

Names
- Preferred IUPAC name 2-Benzothiophene
- Other names Isobenzothiophene

Identifiers
CAS Number	270-82-6
3D model (JSmol)	Interactive image
Beilstein Reference	1280862
ChEBI	CHEBI:36953
ChemSpider	119858
PubChem CID	136081
UNII	P5T9LN69TC
CompTox Dashboard (EPA)	DTXSID00181489
- InChI: InChI=1S/C8H6S/c1-2-4-8-6-9-5-7(8)3-1/h1-6H Key: LYTMVABTDYMBQK-UHFFFAOYSA-N; InChI=1/C8H6S/c1-2-4-8-6-9-5-7(8)3-1/h1-6H Key: LYTMVABTDYMBQK-UHFFFAOYAW
- SMILES: s2cc1ccccc1c2

Properties
Chemical formula	C_{8}H_{6}S
Molar mass	134.1982
Density	1.187 g/cm^{3}

Hazards
Flash point	66.8 °C (152.2 °F; 339.9 K)
- Except where otherwise noted, data are given for materials in their standard state (at 25 °C [77 °F], 100 kPa). verify (what is ?) Infobox references

Benzo[c]thiophene is an organic compound with the chemical formula C_{8}H_{6}S.

The similarly named Benzo[b]thiophene is an isomer with the sulfur in the position adjacent to the benzene ring. Benzo[b]thiophene is more stable and far more commonly encountered.
