= Nitromersol =

Organomercury antiseptic and antifungal agent

Names
- IUPAC name 5-Methyl-2-nitro-7-oxa-8-mercurabicyclo[4.2.0]octa-1(6),2,4-triene
- Other names Metaphen; 6-Methyl-3-nitrobenzoxamercurete; 4-Nitro-5-hydroxymercuriorthocresol

Identifiers
CAS Number	133-58-4
3D model (JSmol)	Interactive image
ChemSpider	16739372
ECHA InfoCard	100.004.648
PubChem CID	16682935
UNII	RU6242GP15
CompTox Dashboard (EPA)	DTXSID9057638
- InChI: InChI=1S/C7H6NO3.Hg/c1-5-2-3-6(8(10)11)4-7(5)9;/h2-3,9H,1H3;/q;+1/p-1 Key: UEHLXXJAWYWUGI-UHFFFAOYSA-M; InChI=1/C7H6NO3.Hg/c1-5-2-3-6(8(10)11)4-7(5)9;/h2-3,9H,1H3;/q;+1/p-1/rC7H5HgNO3/c1-4-2-3-5(9(10)11)6-7(4)12-8-6/h2-3H,1H3 Key: UEHLXXJAWYWUGI-ITKDQSLKAT
- SMILES: Cc1ccc(c2[Hg]Oc12)[N+]([O-])=O

Properties
Chemical formula	C_{7}H_{5}HgNO_{3}
Molar mass	351.713 g·mol^{−1}

Hazards
- Occupational safety and health (OHS/OSH)
Main hazards	moderately toxic
- Except where otherwise noted, data are given for materials in their standard state (at 25 °C [77 °F], 100 kPa). Infobox references

Nitromersol (metaphen) is a mercury-containing organic compound that is primarily used as an antiseptic and disinfectant. It is a brown-yellow solid that has no odor or taste, does not irritate the skin or mucous membranes, and has no impact on rubber or metallic instruments, including surgical and dental tools.

== Toxicity and phase-out ==
This compound is a confirmed animal carcinogen. It can emit toxic fumes of NO_{x} and mercury vapor when heated. In 1998, use of nitromersol (and other mercury-containing products) as OTC first-aid antiseptics and products for diaper rash and vaginal contraceptives was disallowed by the FDA. Nitromersol can cause hypersensitivity reactions.

== See also ==
- Thiomersal – Organomercury antiseptic and antifungal agent
- Phenylmercuric nitrate - an organomercury compound with powerful antiseptic and antifungal effects
