= Phenylmercury acetate =

- Skeletal formula of phenylmercury acetate

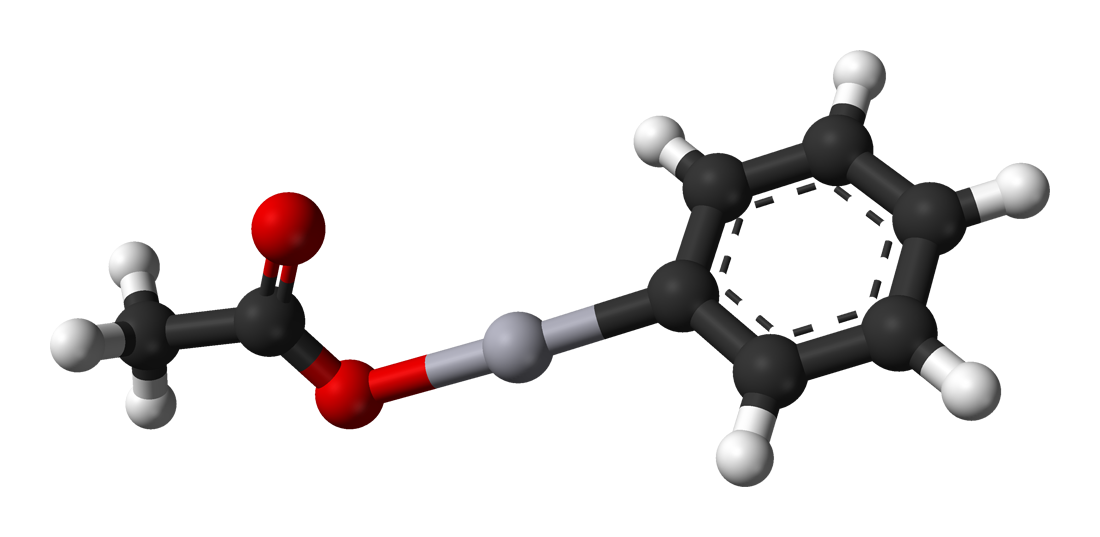
- Ball and stick model of the phenylmercury acetate molecule

Names
- Systematic IUPAC name acetyloxy(phenyl)mercury

Identifiers
CAS Number	62-38-4
3D model (JSmol)	Interactive image; Interactive image
Beilstein Reference	3662930
ChEBI	CHEBI:27684
ChEMBL	ChEMBL1333953
ChemSpider	10294750
ECHA InfoCard	100.000.484
EC Number	200-532-5
Gmelin Reference	83357
KEGG	D05464
MeSH	Phenylmercuric+acetate
PubChem CID	16682730
RTECS number	OV6475000
UNII	OSX88361UX
UN number	1674
CompTox Dashboard (EPA)	DTXSID7021150
- InChI: InChI=1S/C6H5.C2H4O2.Hg/c1-2-4-6-5-3-1;1-2(3)4;/h1-5H;1H3,(H,3,4);/q;;+1/p-1 Key: XEBWQGVWTUSTLN-UHFFFAOYSA-M; InChI=1S/C6H5.C2H4O2.Hg/c1-2-4-6-5-3-1;1-2(3)4;/h1-5H;1H3,(H,3,4);/q;;+1/p-1; Key: XEBWQGVWTUSTLN-UHFFFAOYSA-M
- SMILES: CC(=O)O[Hg]C1=CC=CC=C1; CC(=O)O[Hg]c1ccccc1

Properties
Chemical formula	CH_{3}CO_{2}HgC_{6}H_{5}
Molar mass	336.742 g·mol^{−1}
Appearance	colorless, lustrous crystals
Melting point	148 to 151 °C (298 to 304 °F; 421 to 424 K)

Hazards
- GHS labelling
Pictograms	(GHS05: Corrosive) (GHS06: Toxic) (GHS08: Health hazard) (GHS09: Environmental hazard)
Signal word	Danger
Hazard statements	H301, H314, H372, H410
Precautionary statements	P260, P264, P270, P273, P280, P301+P310, P301+P330+P331, P303+P361+P353, P304+P340, P305+P351+P338, P310, P314, P321, P330, P363, P391, P405, P501
Safety data sheet (SDS)	Oxford MSDS
- Except where otherwise noted, data are given for materials in their standard state (at 25 °C [77 °F], 100 kPa). verify (what is ?) Infobox references

Phenylmercuric acetate is an organomercury compound with the chemical formula CH_{3}CO_{2}HgC_{6}H_{5}. It was used as a preservative, disinfectant, antitranspirant, and catalyst.

== Properties ==
Phenylmercuric acetate forms colorless, lustrous crystals, and is soluble in ethanol, benzene, acetic acid, and sparingly in water.

== Applications ==
Phenylmercuric acetate has been used as a preservative in eyedrops and paint, disinfectant, former fungicide in agriculture, and a potential fungicide in leather processing. It kills crabgrass, the seedlings of which are especially vulnerable, but leaves most lawn grasses intact. It exhibits anti-fungal activity against a broad range of ocular pathogenic fungi, with the greatest activity against Fusarium sporotrichioides, and has been investigated as a potential treatment for keratomycosis.

Phenylmercuric acetate was used for disinfecting mucous membranes but, due to toxicological and ecotoxicological reasons, is no longer used.

Phenylmercuric acetate was used as a catalyst in the manufacture of polyurethane flexible flooring, including 3M Tartan track. That flooring became popular for public buildings, especially school gymnasia, in the 1950s through the 1970s; and traces of the catalyst remained detectable in Idaho public schools as late as 2006.

== Hazards ==
Contact with phenylmercuric acetate can cause allergic reactions, such as erythema and contact urticaria syndrome. IgE plays a crucial role in contact urticaria syndrome pathogenesis.

A rare side effect of phenylmercuric acetate in eye drops is mercurialentis, the buildup of pigment on the anterior capsule of the lens. This has been estimated to affect 18 of 500 patients who have used eye drops containing phenylmercuric acetate two to four times a day for more than six years. The pigmentation is not associated with visual impairment nor any ocular abnormalities.

== See also ==
- Phenylmercuric borate
- Phenylmercuric nitrate
