= Thiosalicylic acid =

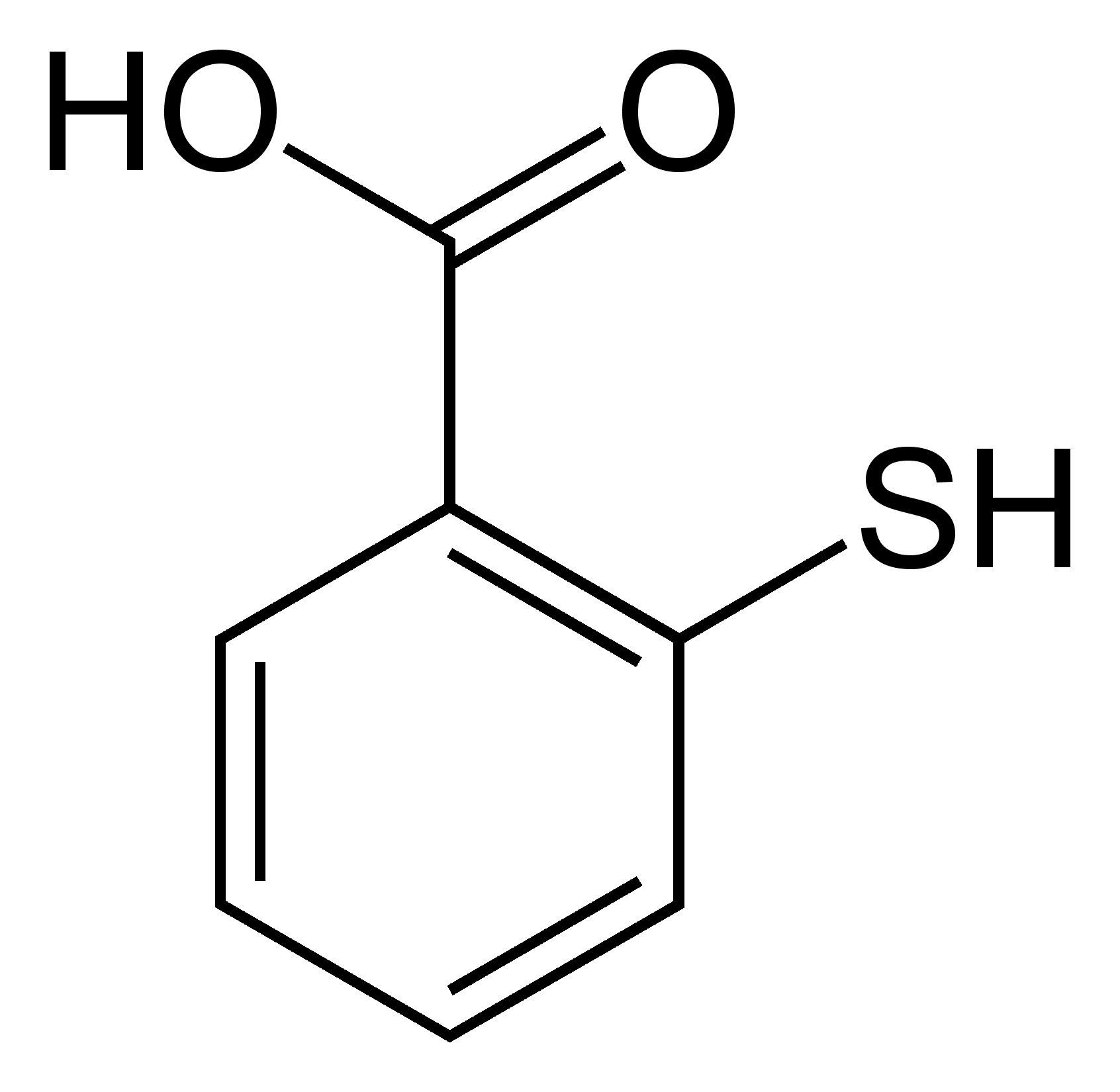
Skeletal formula of thiosalicylic acid
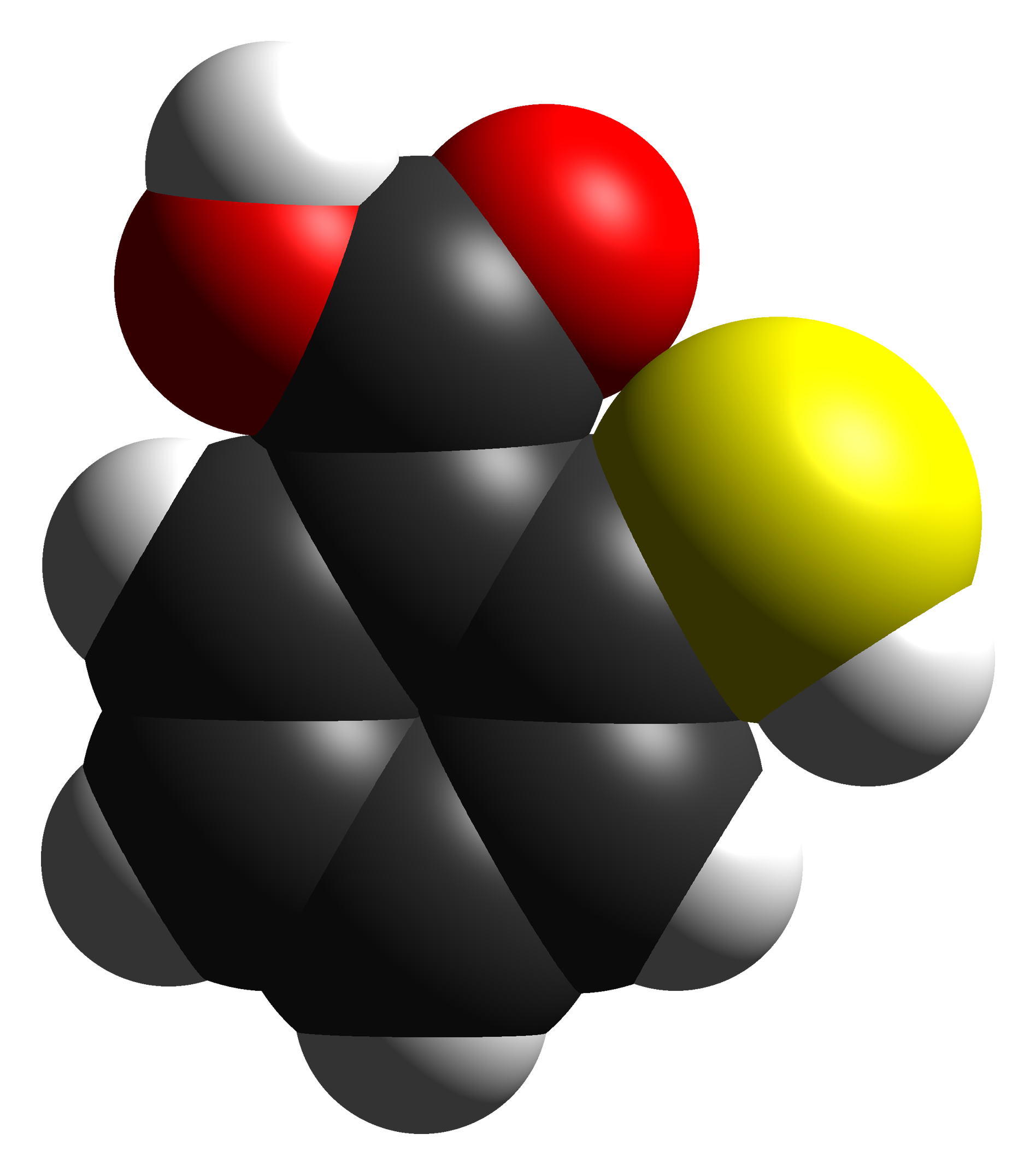
Space-filling model of thiosalicylic acid

Names
- Preferred IUPAC name 2-Sulfanylbenzoic acid
- Other names 2-Mercaptobenzoic acid o-Thiosalicylic acid ortho-Thiosalicylic acid

Identifiers
CAS Number	147-93-3
3D model (JSmol)	Interactive image; Interactive image
Beilstein Reference	508507
ChEBI	CHEBI:59124
ChEMBL	ChEMBL119888
ChemSpider	5248
ECHA InfoCard	100.005.187
EC Number	205-704-3
Gmelin Reference	3838
KEGG	D08586
MeSH	2-Thiosalicylic+acid
PubChem CID	5443
RTECS number	DH3325000
UNII	CIP6LXN5XW
CompTox Dashboard (EPA)	DTXSID4049032
- InChI: InChI=1S/C7H6O2S/c8-7(9)5-3-1-2-4-6(5)10/h1-4,10H,(H,8,9) Key: NBOMNTLFRHMDEZ-UHFFFAOYSA-N
- SMILES: OC(=O)C1=CC=CC=C1S; SC1=C(C(O)=O)C=CC=C1

Properties
Chemical formula	ortho-C_{6}H_{4}(SH)(COOH)
Molar mass	154.18 g·mol^{−1}
Appearance	Leaf or needle shaped yellow crystals
Density	1.49 g cm^{−3}
Melting point	162 to 169 °C (324 to 336 °F; 435 to 442 K)
log P	2.39
Acidity (pK_{a})	3.501

Hazards
- GHS labelling
Pictograms	(GHS07: Exclamation mark)
Signal word	Warning
Hazard statements	H315, H319, H335

Related compounds
Related compounds	Salicylic acid; Thiophenol; 4-Mercaptobenzoic acid
- Except where otherwise noted, data are given for materials in their standard state (at 25 °C [77 °F], 100 kPa). verify (what is ?) Infobox references

Thiosalicylic acid is an organosulfur compound containing carboxyl and sulfhydryl functional groups. Its molecular formula is ortho-C_{6}H_{4}(−SH)(−C(=O)−OH). It is a yellow solid that is slightly soluble in water, ethanol and diethyl ether, and alkanes, but more soluble in DMSO.

== Preparation ==
Thiosalicylic acid can be prepared from anthranilic acid via diazotization followed by the addition of sodium sulfide and then reduction with zinc.

== Applications ==
Thiosalicylic acid is a precursor to the dyestuff thioindigo. It is also used to make the vaccine preservative thiomersal. It is a precursor to drug candidates for treatment of atherosclerosis and melanoma. The preservative benzisothiazolinone is prepared from thiosalicylic acid.

Thiosalicylic acid is an excellent ligand, able to coordinate a very wide range of metals.
