= Pyruvate cycling =

Pyruvate cycling commonly refers to an intracellular loop of spatial movements and chemical transformations involving pyruvate. Spatial movements occur between mitochondria and cytosol and chemical transformations create various Krebs cycle intermediates. In all variants, pyruvate is imported into the mitochondrion for processing through part of the Krebs cycle. In addition to pyruvate, alpha-ketoglutarate may also be imported. At various points, the intermediate product is exported to the cytosol for additional transformations and then re-imported. Three specific pyruvate cycles are generally considered, each named for the principal molecule exported from the mitochondrion: malate, citrate, and isocitrate. Other variants may exist, such as dissipative or "futile" pyruvate cycles.

This cycle is usually studied in relation to Glucose Stimulated Insulin Secretion ( or GSIS ) and there is thought to be a relationship between the insulin response and NADPH produced from this cycle but the specifics are not clear and particular confusion exists about the role of malic enzymes. It has been observed in various cell types including islet cells.

The pyruvate-malate cycle was described in liver and kidney preparations as early as 1971.
