= Phenylmercuric nitrate =

Organomercury compound with powerful antiseptic and antifungal effects

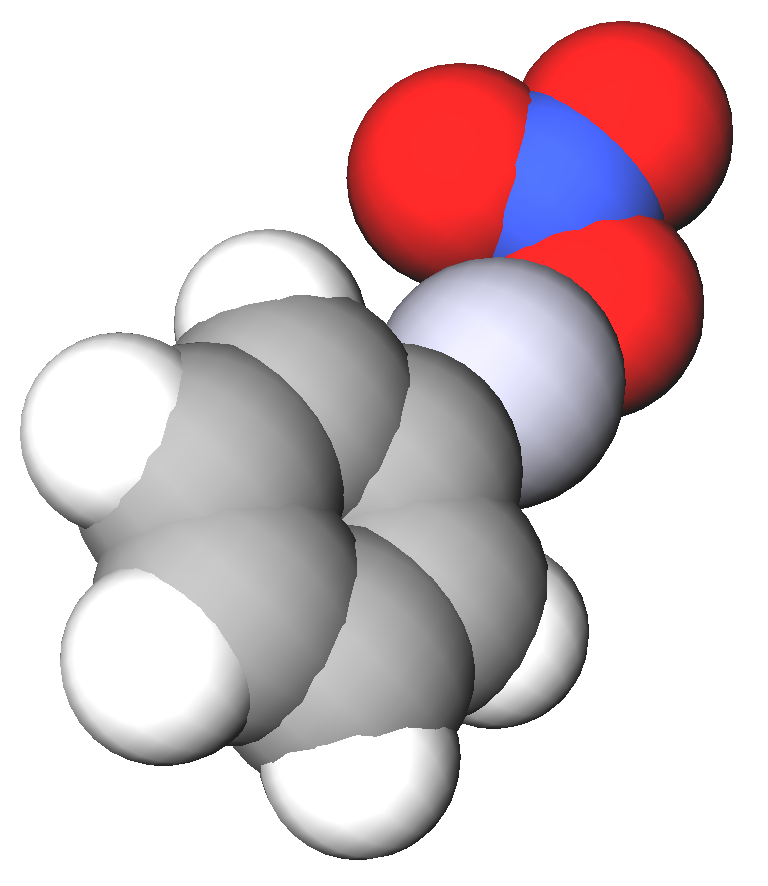

Names
- IUPAC name nitrooxy(phenyl)mercury

Identifiers
CAS Number	55-68-5
3D model (JSmol)	Interactive image
ChEBI	CHEBI:136021
ChemSpider	13854801
ECHA InfoCard	100.000.221
EC Number	200-242-9
PubChem CID	16682924
RTECS number	OW8400000
UNII	CG8692ZN14
UN number	1895
CompTox Dashboard (EPA)	DTXSID6044569
- InChI: InChI=1S/C6H5.Hg.NO3/c1-2-4-6-5-3-1;;2-1(3)4/h1-5H;;/q;+1;-1 Key: PDTFCHSETJBPTR-UHFFFAOYSA-N
- SMILES: C1=CC=C(C=C1)[Hg]O[N+](=O)[O-]

Properties
Chemical formula	C_{6}H_{5}HgNO_{3}
Molar mass	339.702 g/mol
Melting point	176–186 °C (349–367 °F; 449–459 K)

Hazards
- Occupational safety and health (OHS/OSH)
Main hazards	Toxic
- GHS labelling
Pictograms	(GHS05: Corrosive) (GHS06: Toxic) (GHS08: Health hazard) (GHS09: Environmental hazard)
Signal word	Danger
Hazard statements	H301, H314, H372, H410
Precautionary statements	P260, P264, P270, P273, P280, P301+P310, P301+P330+P331, P303+P361+P353, P304+P340, P305+P351+P338, P310, P314, P321, P330, P363, P391, P405, P501
- Except where otherwise noted, data are given for materials in their standard state (at 25 °C [77 °F], 100 kPa). Infobox references

Phenylmercuric nitrate is an organomercury compound with powerful antiseptic and antifungal effects. It was once commonly used as a topical solution for disinfecting wounds, but as with all organomercury compounds it is highly toxic, especially to the kidneys, and is no longer used in this application. However it is still used in low concentrations as a preservative in eye drops for ophthalmic use, making it one of the few organomercury derivatives remaining in current medical use.

== See also ==
- Merbromin
- Phenylmercury acetate
- Phenylmercuric borate
- Thiomersal
