= Benzothiophene =

Aromatic organic compound

- Benzothiophene

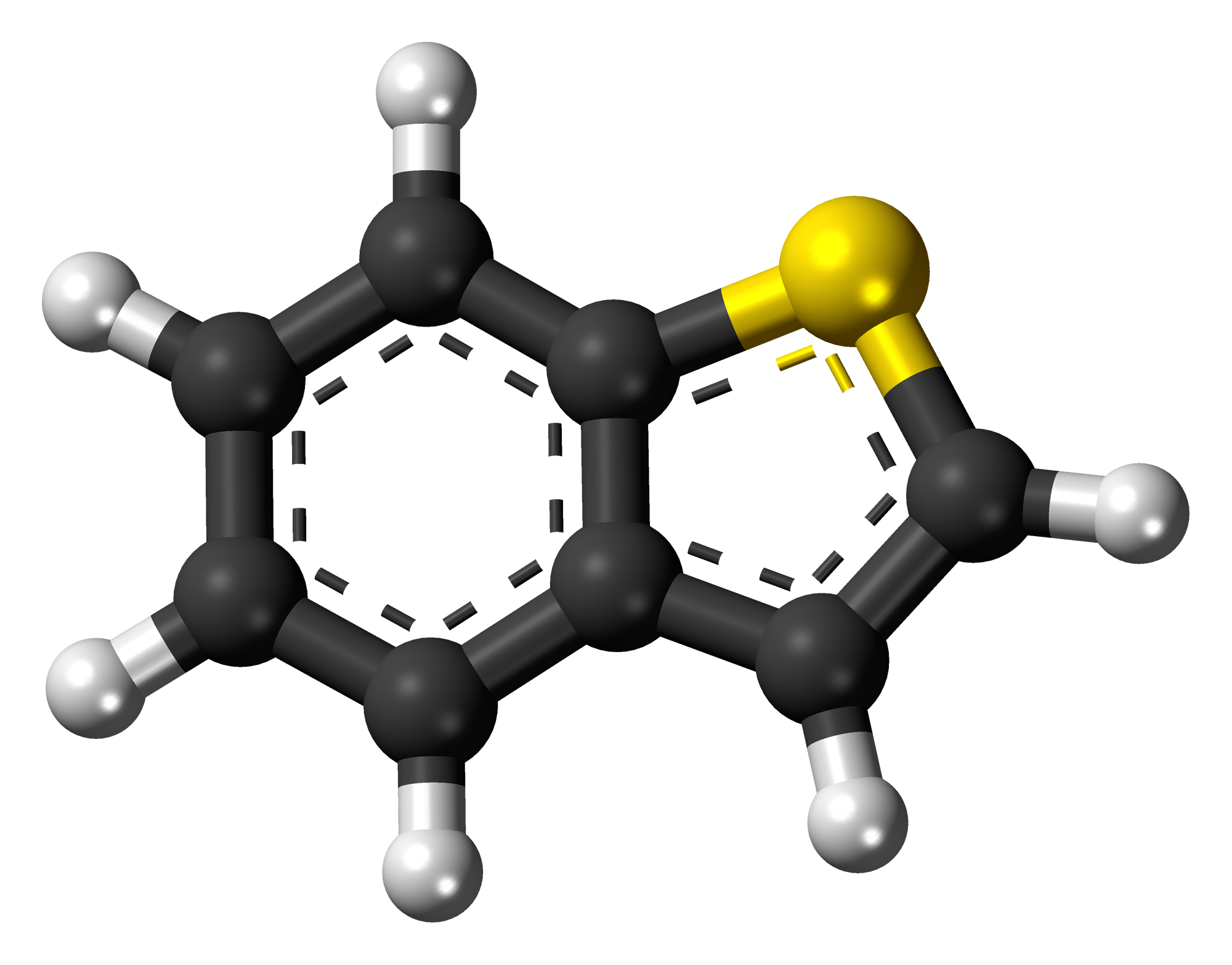
- Benzothiophene

Names
- Preferred IUPAC name 1-Benzothiophene
- Other names Benzo[b]thiophene; Thianaphthene; Benzothiofuran

Identifiers
CAS Number	95-15-8
3D model (JSmol)	Interactive image
ChEBI	CHEBI:35858
ChEMBL	ChEMBL87112
ChemSpider	6951
ECHA InfoCard	100.002.178
EC Number	202-395-7
PubChem CID	7221 [b]
RTECS number	202-395-7
UNII	073790YQ2G
CompTox Dashboard (EPA)	DTXSID2052736
- InChI: InChI=1S/C8H6S/c1-2-4-8-7(3-1)5-6-9-8/h1-6H Key: FCEHBMOGCRZNNI-UHFFFAOYSA-N; InChI=1/C8H6S/c1-2-4-8-7(3-1)5-6-9-8/h1-6H Key: FCEHBMOGCRZNNI-UHFFFAOYAI
- SMILES: s2c1ccccc1cc2

Properties
Chemical formula	C_{8}H_{6}S
Molar mass	134.20 g·mol^{−1}
Appearance	White solid
Density	1.15 g/cm^{3}
Melting point	32 °C (90 °F; 305 K)
Boiling point	221 °C (430 °F; 494 K)

Hazards
- GHS labelling
Pictograms	(GHS07: Exclamation mark) (GHS09: Environmental hazard)
Signal word	Warning
Hazard statements	H302, H411
Precautionary statements	P264, P270, P273, P301+P312, P330, P391, P501
Flash point	110 °C (230 °F; 383 K)

Related compounds
Related compounds	Thiophene, Indene, Benzofuran, Indole
- Except where otherwise noted, data are given for materials in their standard state (at 25 °C [77 °F], 100 kPa). verify (what is ?) Infobox references

Benzothiophene is an aromatic organic compound with a molecular formula C_{8}H_{6}S and an odor similar to naphthalene (mothballs). It occurs naturally as a constituent of petroleum-related deposits such as lignite tar. Benzothiophene has no household use. In addition to benzo[b]thiophene, a second isomer is known: benzo[c]thiophene.

Benzothiophene finds use in research as a starting material for the synthesis of larger, usually bioactive structures. It is found within the chemical structures of pharmaceutical drugs such as raloxifene, zileuton, and sertaconazole, and also BTCP. It is also used in the manufacturing of dyes such as thioindigo.

== Synthesis ==
Most syntheses of benzothiophene create substituted benzothiophenes as a precursor to further reactions. An example is the reaction of an alkyne-substituted 2-bromobenzene with either sodium sulfide or potassium sulfide to form benzothiophene with an alkyl substitution at position 2.

Thiourea can be used as a reagent in place of sodium sulfide or potassium sulfide.

In the presence of a gold catalyst, a more complex 2,3-disubstituted benzothiophene can be synthesised.

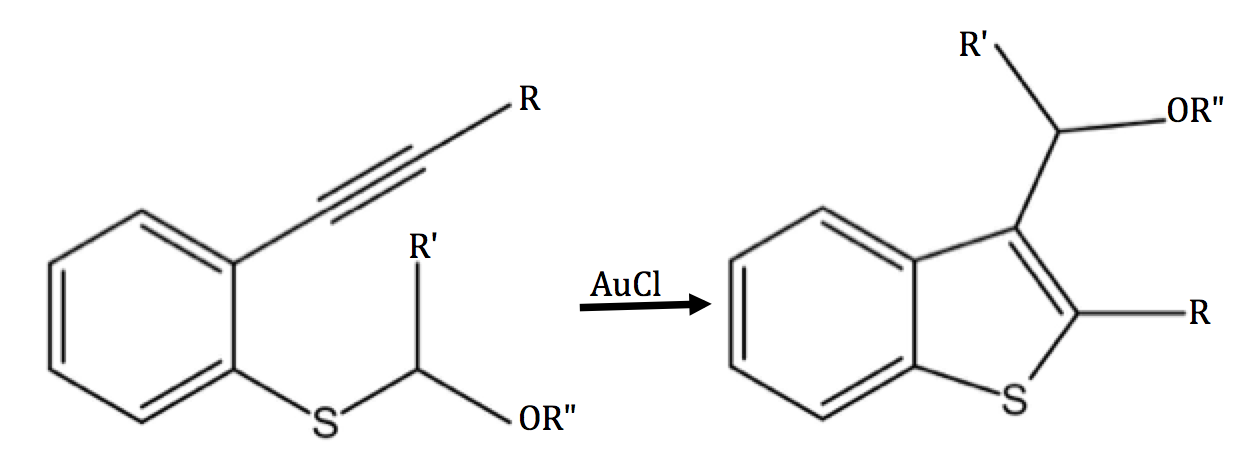
