= Organomercury chemistry =

Group of chemical compounds containing mercury

Organomercury compounds contain at least one carbon bonded to a mercury atom, shown here.

Organomercury chemistry refers to the study of organometallic compounds that contain mercury. Many organomercury compounds are highly toxic, but some are, or have once been, used in medicine, e.g., merbromin ("Mercurochrome") and the vaccine preservative thiomersal.

== Structure and bonding ==
Most organomercury compounds feature diamagnetic Hg(II) and adopt a linear C−Hg−X structure. Indeed, no organic derivatives of Hg^{2+}_{2} are known, as Hg^{2+}_{2} requires electronegative substituents for condensed-phase stability.

Hg(II) derivatives are neither Lewis basic or Lewis acidic. They are stable to oxygen and water, indicating the low polarity of the Hg−C bond.

The structure of "mercurocene" is instructive. When made in the 1950s, it was too sensitive for structural determination. Later analysis determined that the products have the mercury σ-bonded to just one carbon of each ring, rather than a metallocene with the metal bonded to the rings' π systems.

== Synthesis ==
Tetrakis(acetoxymercurio)methane

Reflecting the strength of the C−Hg bond, organomercury compounds are generated by many methods. Indeed, mercury adsorbs onto laboratory glassware, such that laboratories performing mercury experiments may have difficulty avoiding C−Hg bond formation. In some regards, organomercury chemistry more closely resembles organopalladium chemistry and contrasts with organocadmium compounds.

=== Synthesis from elemental mercury ===
Metallic mercury reacts only slowly with methyl iodide to give dimethylmercury. With more electrophilic alkylating agents, the reaction is more efficient. Also, sodium amalgams react with organic halides to give diorganomercury compounds.

=== Mercuration of aromatic rings ===
Electron-rich arenes, such as phenol, undergo mercuration upon treatment with Hg(O_{2}CCH_{3})_{2}. The one acetate group that remains on the mercury atom can be displaced by chloride:

C_{6}H_{5}OH + Hg(O_{2}CCH_{3})_{2} → C_{6}H_{4}(OH)–HgO_{2}CCH_{3} + CH_{3}CO_{2}H
C_{6}H_{4}(OH)–HgO_{2}CCH_{3} + NaCl → C_{6}H_{4}(OH)–HgCl + NaO_{2}CCH_{3}

The first such reaction, including a mercuration of benzene itself, was first reported by Otto Dimroth in 1898.

=== Addition to alkenes and alkynes ===
The Hg^{2+} center binds to alkenes, inducing the addition of hydroxide and alkoxide. For example, treatment of methyl acrylate with mercuric acetate in methanol gives an α-mercuri ester:

Hg(O_{2}CCH_{3})_{2} + CH_{2}=CHCO_{2}CH_{3} → CH_{3}OCH_{2}CH(HgO_{2}CCH_{3})CO_{2}CH_{3}

The resulting Hg−C bond can be cleaved with bromine to give the corresponding alkyl bromide:

CH_{3}OCH_{2}CH(HgO_{2}CCH_{3})CO_{2}CH_{3} + Br_{2} → CH_{3}OCH_{2}CHBrCO_{2}CH_{3} + BrHgO_{2}CCH_{3}

This reaction is called the Hofmann–Sand reaction.

Internal alkynes undergo mercuration with incorporation of solvent:

RC≡CR + Hg(OAc)_{2} + ROH → R(AcOHg)C=CR(OR) + HOAc

=== Reaction of Hg(II) compounds with C-heteroatom bonds ===
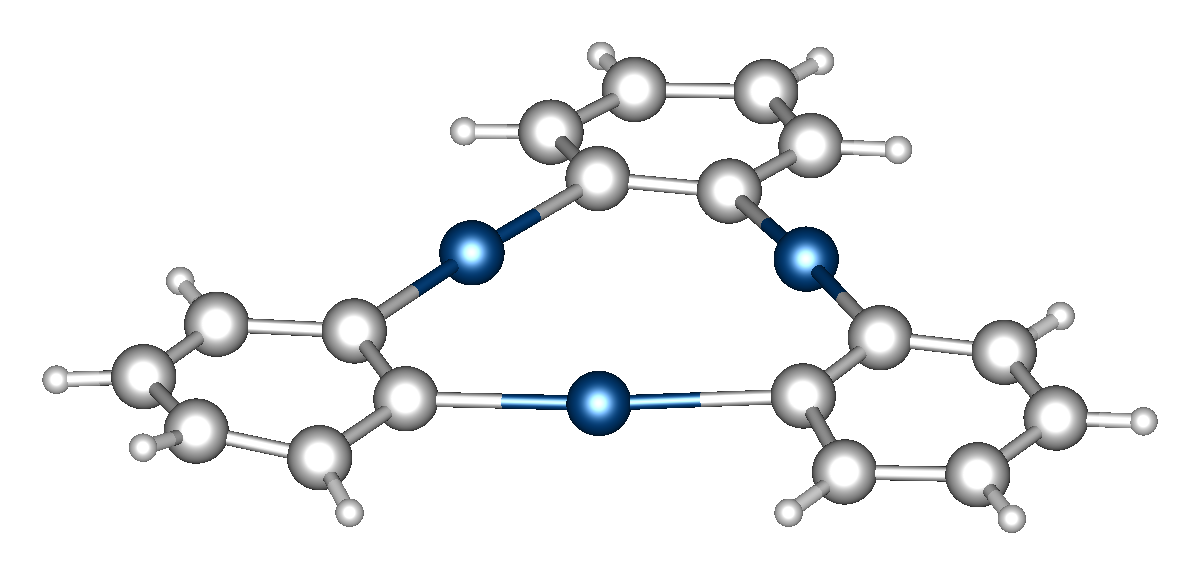
(C_{6}H_{4}Hg)_{3}, a planar molecule, is the product of the reaction of sodium amalgam and 1,2-dihalobenzenes.

A general synthetic route to organomercury compounds entails alkylation with Grignard reagents and organolithium compounds. Diethylmercury results from the reaction of mercury chloride with two equivalents of ethylmagnesium bromide, a conversion typically conducted in diethyl ether solution.

Similarly, diphenylmercury can be prepared by reaction of mercury chloride and phenylmagnesium bromide. A related preparation entails formation of phenylsodium in the presence of mercury(II) salts.

Hg(II) can be alkylated by treatment with diazonium salts in the presence of copper metal. In this way 2-chloromercuri-naphthalene has been prepared.

4-Chloromercuritoluene is obtained by the chloromercuration of sodium toluenesulfinite:

CH_{3}C_{6}H_{4}SO_{2}Na + HgCl_{2} → CH_{3}C_{6}H_{4}HgCl + SO_{2} + NaCl

== Reactions ==
Organomercury compounds are versatile synthetic intermediates due to the well-controlled conditions under which Hg−C bonds cleave. The bond is remarkably resilient, as when potassium permanganate oxidizes 4‑chloromercuritoluene to 4‑chloromercuribenzoic acid.

Nevertheless, organomercurials are used in transmetalation reactions. For example diphenylmercury reacts with aluminium to give triphenyl aluminium:

3 (C_{6}H_{5})_{2}Hg + 2 Al → Al(C_{6}H_{5})_{3} + 3 Hg

Organomercury compounds react with halogens to give the corresponding organic halide, and palladium catalyzes cross-coupling between organomercurials and organic halides. This approach usually forms C−C bonds with low selectivity, but selectivity increases in the presence of halide salts. Carbonylation of lactones has been shown to employ Hg(II) reagents under palladium catalyzed conditions. (C−C bond formation and cis ester formation).

Phenylmercuric chloride reversibly stores dichlorocarbene as phenyl(trichloromethyl)mercury. A convenient carbene source is sodium trichloroacetate:

C_{6}H_{5}HgCl + CCl_{2} → C_{6}H_{5}HgCCl_{3},

reversed with heat.

Organomercury halides react with hydride sources to give organomercury hydrides. Those compounds have an exceptionally weak C−Hg bond, and readily cleave to alkyl radicals.

== Applications ==
The toxicity of organomercury compounds notwithstanding, organomercury compounds have often proved useful catalysts.

=== Hydration and related reactions of acetylene ===
Several Hg-catalyzed conversions of acetylene have been commercialized by Hoechst AG, BASF, and Chisso. Acetaldehyde is produced by Hg-catalyzed hydration of acetylene:

C_{2}H_{2} + H_{2}O → CH_{3}CHO

The mishandling Hg-containing waste stream of the Chisso process led to an environmental catastrophe causing Minamata disease.

Ethylidene diacetate, a precursor to acetaldehyde and vinyl acetate, was also produced by a similar process. Some of these routes, once dominant, have been significantly displaced by the Pd-catalyzed Wacker process, a greener process that starts with ethylene. In general oxymercuration reactions of alkenes and alkynes using mercuric compounds proceed via organomercury intermediates. A related reaction forming phenols is the Wolffenstein–Böters reaction.

=== Production of chlorocarbons ===
Mercury-based catalysis is woven throughout the history of chlorinated ethanes and ethylenes. Vinyl chloride is produced by the addition of HCl to acetylene using a mercury-carbon catalyst. Considerable effort is required to limit the contamination of the product with mercury.

=== Medicinal ===
The toxicity is useful when applied at ultra-low concentrations, such in antiseptics like thiomersal and merbromin, and fungicides such as ethylmercury chloride and phenylmercury acetate.

Thiomersal (Merthiolate) is a well-established antiseptic and antifungal agent.

Mercurial diuretics such as mersalyl acid were once in common use, but have been superseded by the thiazides and loop diuretics, which are safer and longer-acting, as well as being orally active.

=== Thiol affinity chromatography ===
Thiols are also known as mercaptans due to their propensity for mercury capture. Thiolates (R-S^{−}) and thioketones (R_{2}C=S), being soft nucleophiles, form strong coordination complexes with mercury(II), a soft electrophile. This mode of action makes them useful for affinity chromatography to separate thiol-containing compounds from complex mixtures. For example, organomercurial agarose gel or gel beads are used to isolate thiolated compounds (such as thiouridine) in a biological sample.

== Toxicity ==
The toxicity of organomercury compounds presents both dangers and benefits. Dimethylmercury in particular is notoriously toxic, but found use as an antifungal agent and insecticide. Merbromin and phenylmercuric borate are used as topical antiseptics, while thimerosal is safely used as a preservative for vaccines and antitoxins.

== See also ==
- Heavy metal poisoning
- Mercury poisoning
- Minamata disease
