= 4-Chloromercuribenzoic acid =

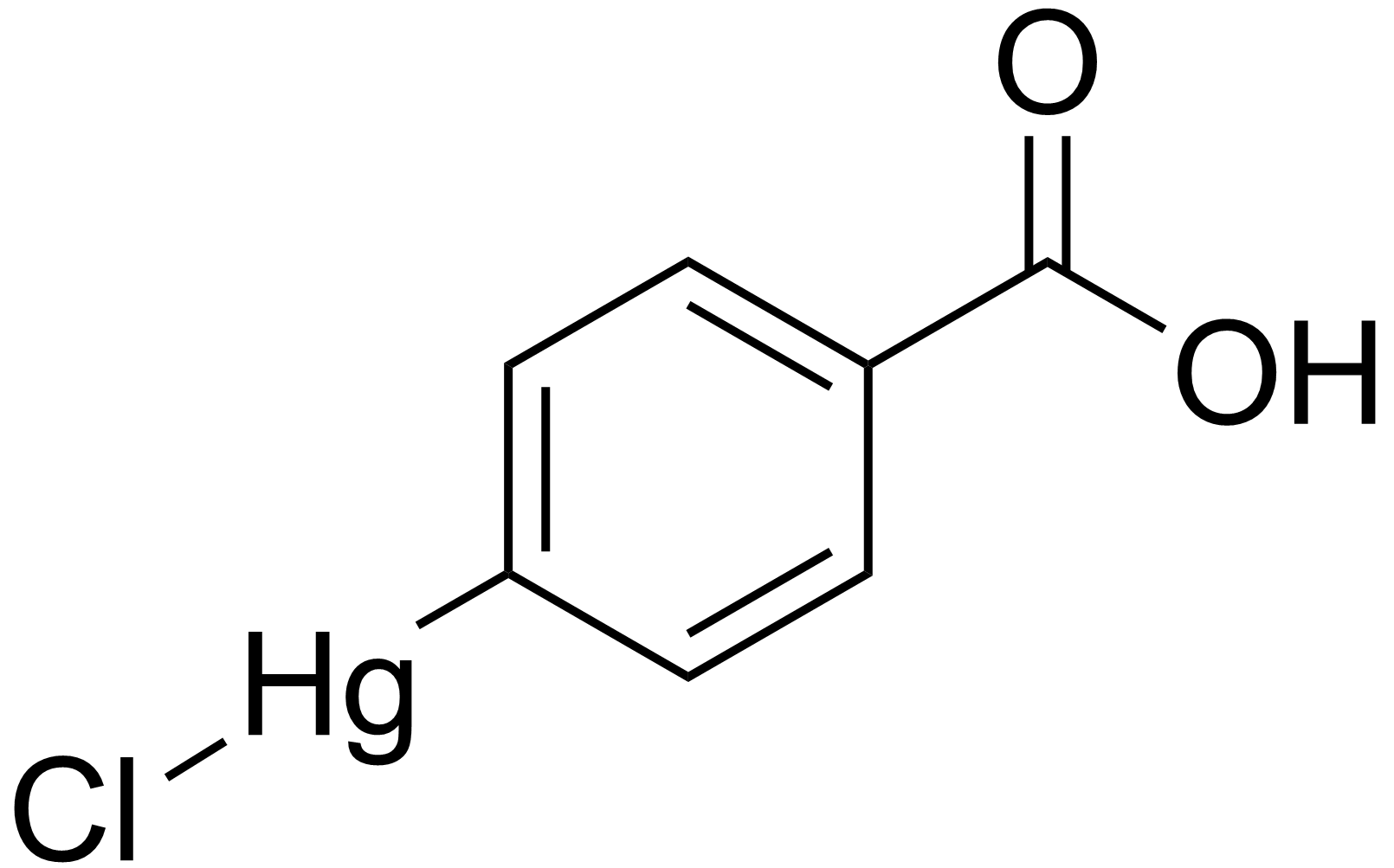

Names
- IUPAC name (4-Carboxyphenyl)chloromercury
- Other names p-Chloromercurybenzoic acid; p-Chloromercuribenzoate; 4-Chloromercuribenzoate

Identifiers
CAS Number	59-85-8
3D model (JSmol)	Interactive image
Abbreviations	PCMB
Beilstein Reference	3662892
ChEBI	CHEBI:28420
ChEMBL	ChEMBL575867
ChemSpider	1667
ECHA InfoCard	100.000.402
EC Number	200-442-6
Gmelin Reference	261316
KEGG	C03444
PubChem CID	1730
UNII	E1LE0WZ4BO
CompTox Dashboard (EPA)	DTXSID8040725
- InChI: InChI=1S/C7H5O2.ClH.Hg/c8-7(9)6-4-2-1-3-5-6;;/h2-5H,(H,8,9);1H;/q;;+1/p-1 Key: YFZOUMNUDGGHIW-UHFFFAOYSA-M; InChI=1/C7H5O2.ClH.Hg/c8-7(9)6-4-2-1-3-5-6;;/h2-5H,(H,8,9);1H;/q;;+1/p-1/rC7H5ClHgO2/c8-9-6-3-1-5(2-4-6)7(10)11/h1-4H,(H,10,11) Key: YFZOUMNUDGGHIW-PSWPUYSSAS
- SMILES: O=C(O)c1ccc([Hg]Cl)cc1

Properties
Chemical formula	C_{7}H_{5}ClHgO_{2}
Molar mass	357.16 g·mol^{−1}
Melting point	287 °C (549 °F; 560 K) (dec.)

Hazards
- GHS labelling
Pictograms	(GHS06: Toxic) (GHS08: Health hazard) (GHS09: Environmental hazard)
Signal word	Danger
Hazard statements	H300, H310, H330, H373, H410
Precautionary statements	P260, P262, P264, P270, P271, P273, P280, P284, P301+P310, P302+P350, P304+P340, P310, P314, P320, P321, P330, P361, P363, P391, P403+P233, P405, P501
- Except where otherwise noted, data are given for materials in their standard state (at 25 °C [77 °F], 100 kPa). verify (what is ?) Infobox references

4-Chloromercuribenzoic acid (p-chloromercuribenzoic acid, PCMB) is an organomercury compound that is used as a protease inhibitor, especially in molecular biology applications.

PCMB reacts with thiol groups in proteins and is therefore an inhibitor of enzymes that are dependent on thiol reactivity, including cysteine proteases such as papain and acetylcholinesterase. Because of this reactivity with thiols, PCMB is also used in titrimetric quantification of thiol groups in proteins.

== Preparation ==
4-Chloromercuribenzoic acid can be prepared by oxidation of 4-chloromercuritoluene using potassium permanganate. 4-chloromercuritoluene is in turn obtained by the chloromercuration of sodium toluene sulfinite:

CH_{3}C_{6}H_{4}SO_{2}Na + HgCl_{2} → CH_{3}C_{6}H_{4}HgCl + SO_{2} + NaCl

== See also ==
- 4-Aminophenylmercuric acetate
