= Mercury(II) acetate =

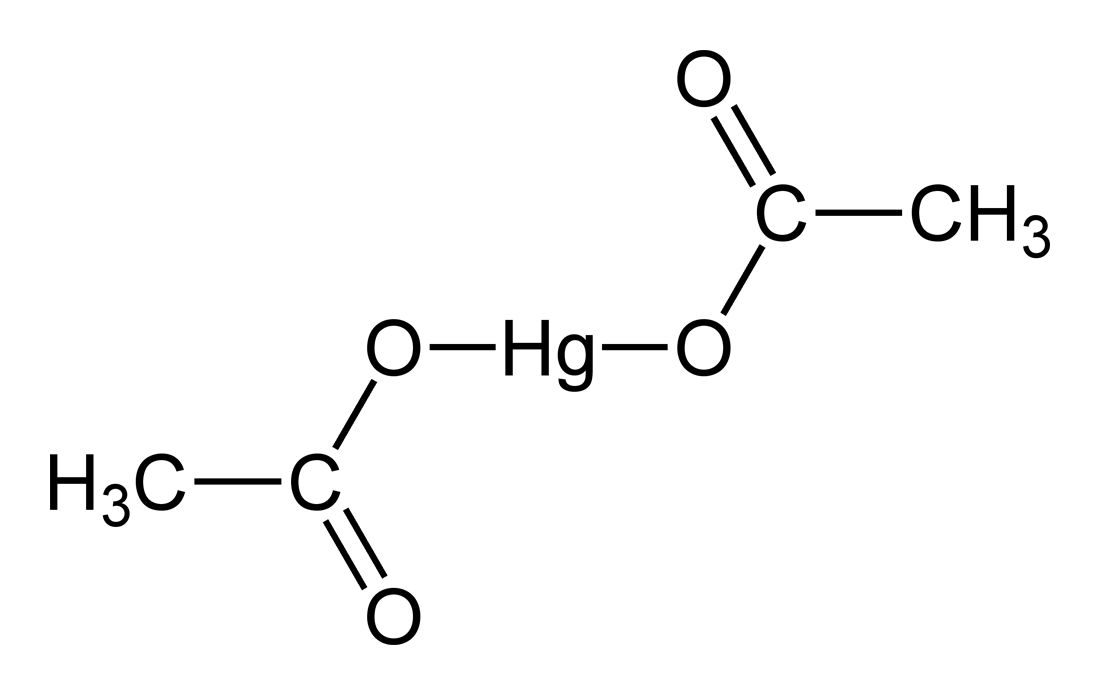

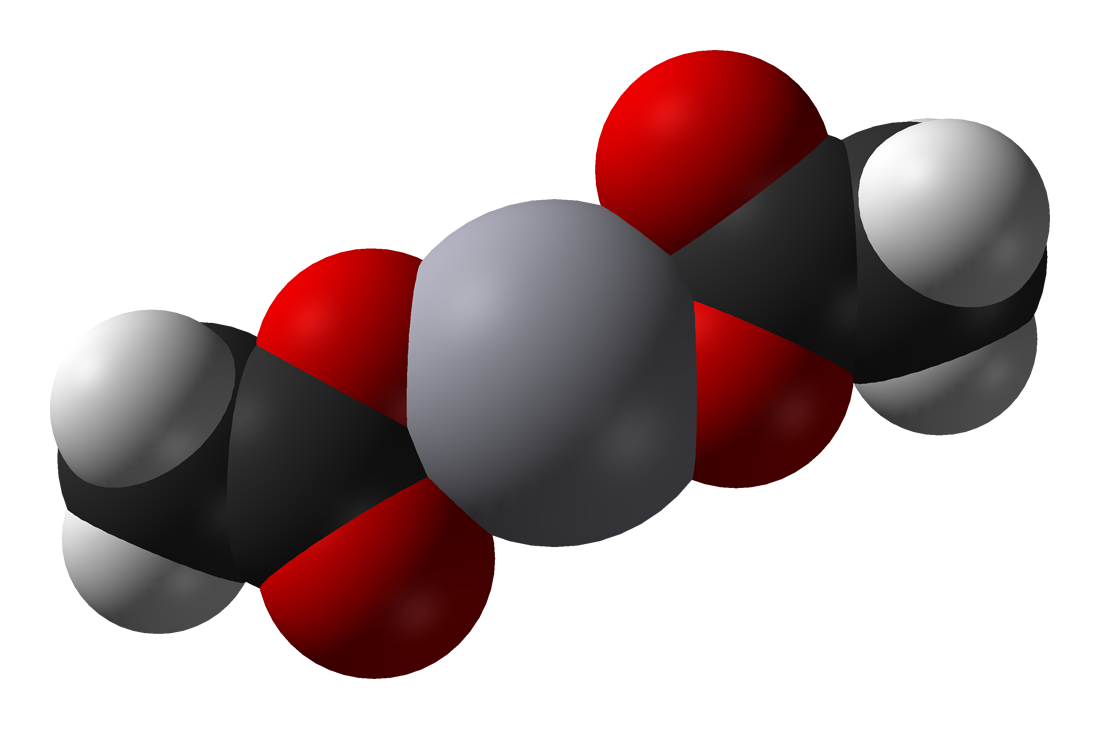

Names
- Other names mercuric acetate mercuriacetate mercury diacetate

Identifiers
CAS Number	1600-27-7
3D model (JSmol)	ionic form: Interactive image; coordination form: Interactive image
ChEBI	CHEBI:33211
ChemSpider	14599
ECHA InfoCard	100.014.993
EC Number	209-766-2
PubChem CID	15337
RTECS number	AI8575000
UNII	R0G1MCT8Y5
UN number	1629
CompTox Dashboard (EPA)	DTXSID4042123
- InChI: InChI=1S/2C2H4O2.Hg/c2*1-2(3)4;/h2*1H3,(H,3,4);/q;;+2/p-2 Key: BRMYZIKAHFEUFJ-UHFFFAOYSA-L; InChI=1/2C2H4O2.Hg/c2*1-2(3)4;/h2*1H3,(H,3,4);/q;;+2/p-2 Key: BRMYZIKAHFEUFJ-NUQVWONBAS
- SMILES: ionic form: [Hg+2].[O-]C(=O)C.[O-]C(=O)C; coordination form: O=C(C)O[Hg]OC(C)=O

Properties
Chemical formula	C_{4}H_{6}O_{4}Hg
Molar mass	318.678 g/mol
Appearance	white crystalline solid
Odor	mild vinegar odor
Density	3.28 g/cm^{3}, solid
Melting point	179 °C (354 °F; 452 K) (decomposes)
Solubility in water	25 g/100 mL (10 °C); 100 g/100 mL (100 °C)
Solubility	soluble in alcohol, diethyl ether
Magnetic susceptibility (χ)	−100·10^{−6} cm^{3}/mol

Hazards
- GHS labelling
Pictograms	(GHS06: Toxic) (GHS08: Health hazard) (GHS09: Environmental hazard)
Signal word	Danger
Hazard statements	H300, H310, H330, H373, H410
Precautionary statements	P260, P262, P264, P270, P271, P273, P280, P284, P301+P310, P302+P350, P304+P340, P310, P314, P320, P321, P330, P361, P363, P391, P403+P233, P405, P501
NFPA 704 (fire diamond)	4 0 0
- Lethal dose or concentration (LD, LC)
LD_{50} (median dose)	40.9 mg/kg (rat, oral); 23.9 mg/kg (mouse, oral)

Related compounds
Related compounds	Mercury(I) acetate
- Except where otherwise noted, data are given for materials in their standard state (at 25 °C [77 °F], 100 kPa). verify (what is ?) Infobox references

Mercury(II) acetate, also known as mercuric acetate, is a chemical compound, the mercury(II) salt of acetic acid, with the formula (CH_{3}COO)_{2}Hg. Commonly abbreviated Hg(OAc)_{2}, this compound is employed as a reagent to generate organomercury compounds from unsaturated organic precursors. It is a white, water-soluble solid, but some samples can appear yellowish with time owing to decomposition.

== Structure ==
Mercury(II) acetate is a crystalline solid consisting of isolated Hg(OAc)_{2} molecules with Hg-O distances of 2.07 Å. Three long, weak intermolecular Hg···O bonds of about 2.75 Å are also present, resulting in a slightly distorted square pyramidal coordination geometry at Hg.

== Synthesis and reactions ==
Mercury(II) acetate can be produced by reaction of mercuric oxide with acetic acid.

HgO + 2 CH_{3}COOH → Hg(CH_{3}COO)_{2} + H_{2}O

=== Inorganic reactions ===
Mercury(II) acetate in acetic acid solution reacts with H_{2}S to rapidly precipitate the black (β) polymorph of HgS. With gentle heating of the slurry, the black solid converts to the red form. The mineral cinnabar is red HgS. The precipitation of HgS as well as a few other sulfides, using hydrogen sulfide is a step in qualitative inorganic analysis.

=== Organic chemistry ===
Electron-rich arenes undergo "mercuration" upon treatment with Hg(OAc)_{2}. This behavior is illustrated with phenol:

C_{6}H_{5}OH + Hg(OAc)_{2} → C_{6}H_{4}(OH)-2-HgOAc + HOAc

The acetate group (OAc) that remains on mercury can be displaced by chloride:

C_{6}H_{4}(OH)-2-HgOAc + NaCl → C_{6}H_{4}(OH)-2-HgCl + NaOAc

The Hg^{2+} center binds to alkenes, inducing the addition of hydroxide and alkoxide. For example, treatment of methyl acrylate with mercuric acetate in methanol gives an α-mercuri ester:

Hg(OAc)_{2} + CH_{2}=CHCO_{2}CH_{3} + CH_{3}OH → CH_{3}OCH_{2}CH(HgOAc)CO_{2}CH_{3} + HOAc

Exploiting the high affinity of mercury(II) for sulfur ligands, Hg(OAc)_{2} can be used as a reagent to deprotect thiol groups in organic synthesis. Similarly Hg(OAc)_{2} has been used to convert thiocarbonate esters into dithiocarbonates:

(RS)_{2}C=S + H_{2}O + Hg(OAc)_{2} → (RS)_{2}C=O + HgS + 2 HOAc

Mercury(II) acetate is used for oxymercuration reactions.

A famous use of Hg(OAc)_{2} was in the synthesis of idoxuridine.

== Toxicity ==
Mercuric acetate is a highly toxic compound, due to it being water-soluble and having mercury ions. Symptoms of mercury poisoning include peripheral neuropathy, skin discoloration and desquamation (peeling and/or shedding of the skin). Chronic exposure may cause reduced intelligence and kidney failure.
