= Phenylmercuric borate =

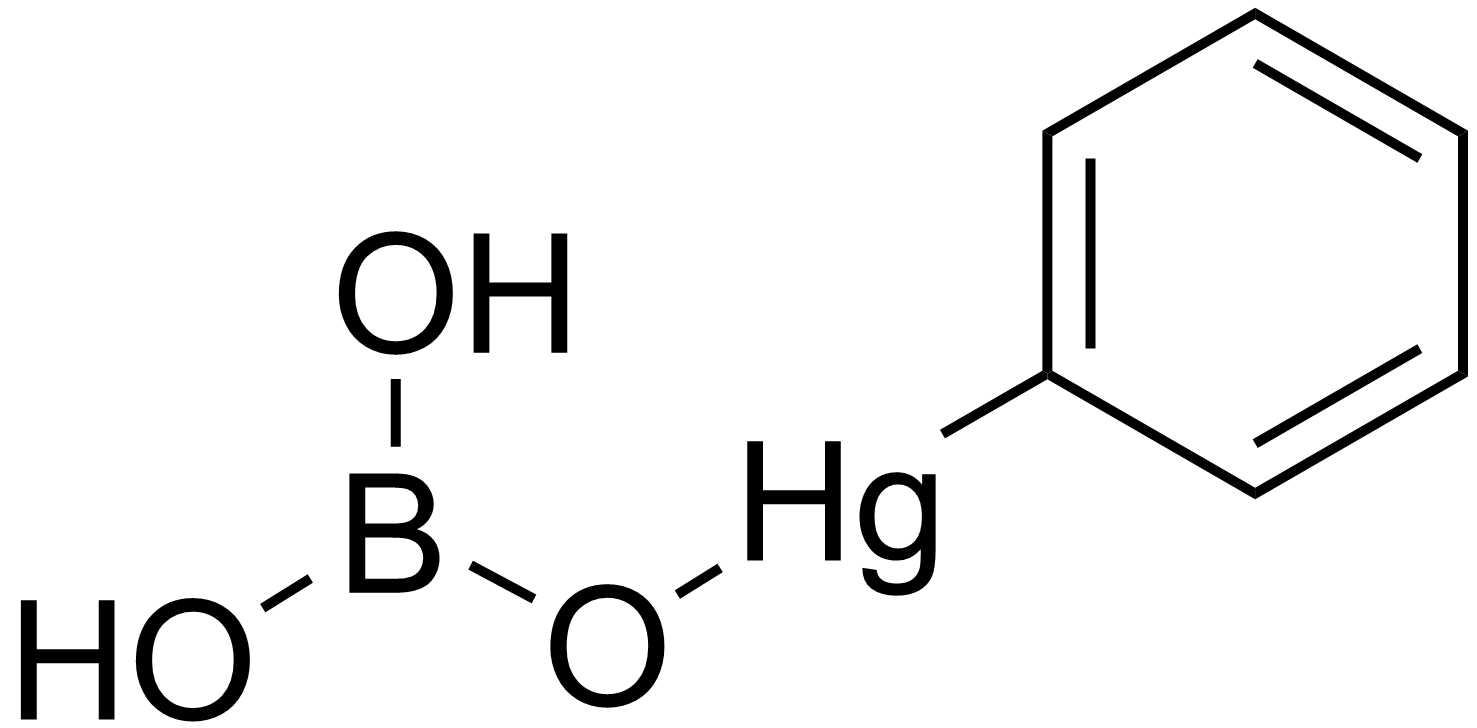

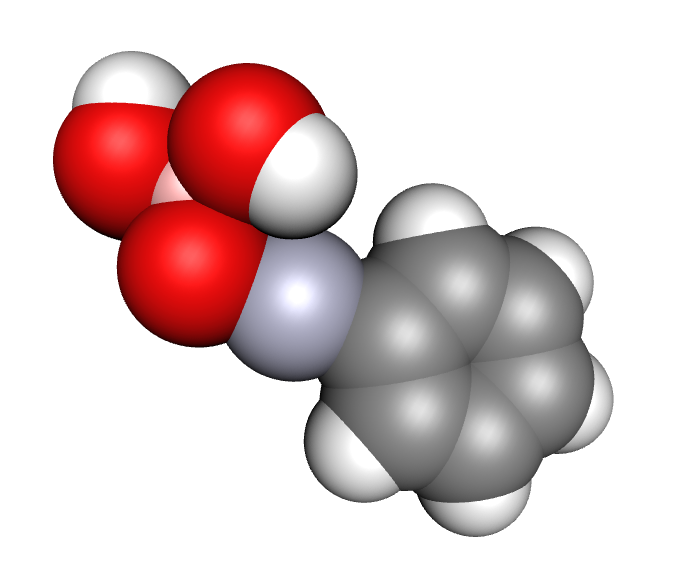

Names
- IUPAC name Phenylmercurium borate
- Other names Merfen

Identifiers
CAS Number	102-98-7
3D model (JSmol)	Interactive image
ChemSpider	21106367
ECHA InfoCard	100.002.790
EC Number	203-068-1
PubChem CID	7627
UNII	ZT1TTY3NGJ
CompTox Dashboard (EPA)	DTXSID5046308
- InChI: InChI=1S/C6H5.BH2O3.Hg/c1-2-4-6-5-3-1;2-1(3)4;/h1-5H;2-3H;/q;-1;+1 Key: VUXSPDNLYQTOSY-UHFFFAOYSA-N; InChI=1/C6H5.BH2O3.Hg/c1-2-4-6-5-3-1;2-1(3)4;/h1-5H;2-3H;/q;-1;+1/rC6H7BHgO3/c9-7(10)11-8-6-4-2-1-3-5-6/h1-5,9-10H Key: VUXSPDNLYQTOSY-BYICNFLTAR
- SMILES: OB(O)O[Hg]c1ccccc1

Properties
Chemical formula	C_{6}H_{7}BHgO_{3}
Molar mass	338.519 g/mol
Melting point	112 to 113 °C (234 to 235 °F; 385 to 386 K)

Pharmacology
ATC code	D08AK02 (WHO)
- Except where otherwise noted, data are given for materials in their standard state (at 25 °C [77 °F], 100 kPa). verify (what is ?) Infobox references

Phenylmercuric borate is a topical antiseptic and disinfectant that is soluble in water, ethanol and glycerol.

It was used until the 1990s as an active ingredient in disinfectants and in the field of wound treatment for the skin, mouth and throat, for example under the trade name Merfen Orange. However, it has been replaced by other substances due to the high mercury content.

It exists as a white to slightly yellowish, crystalline powder or as colorless, shiny crystals that are only slightly soluble in water. The melting point is 112–113 °C.

== See also ==
- Phenylmercuric nitrate
