= Thiomersal =

Organomercury antiseptic and antifungal agent

- Thiomersal

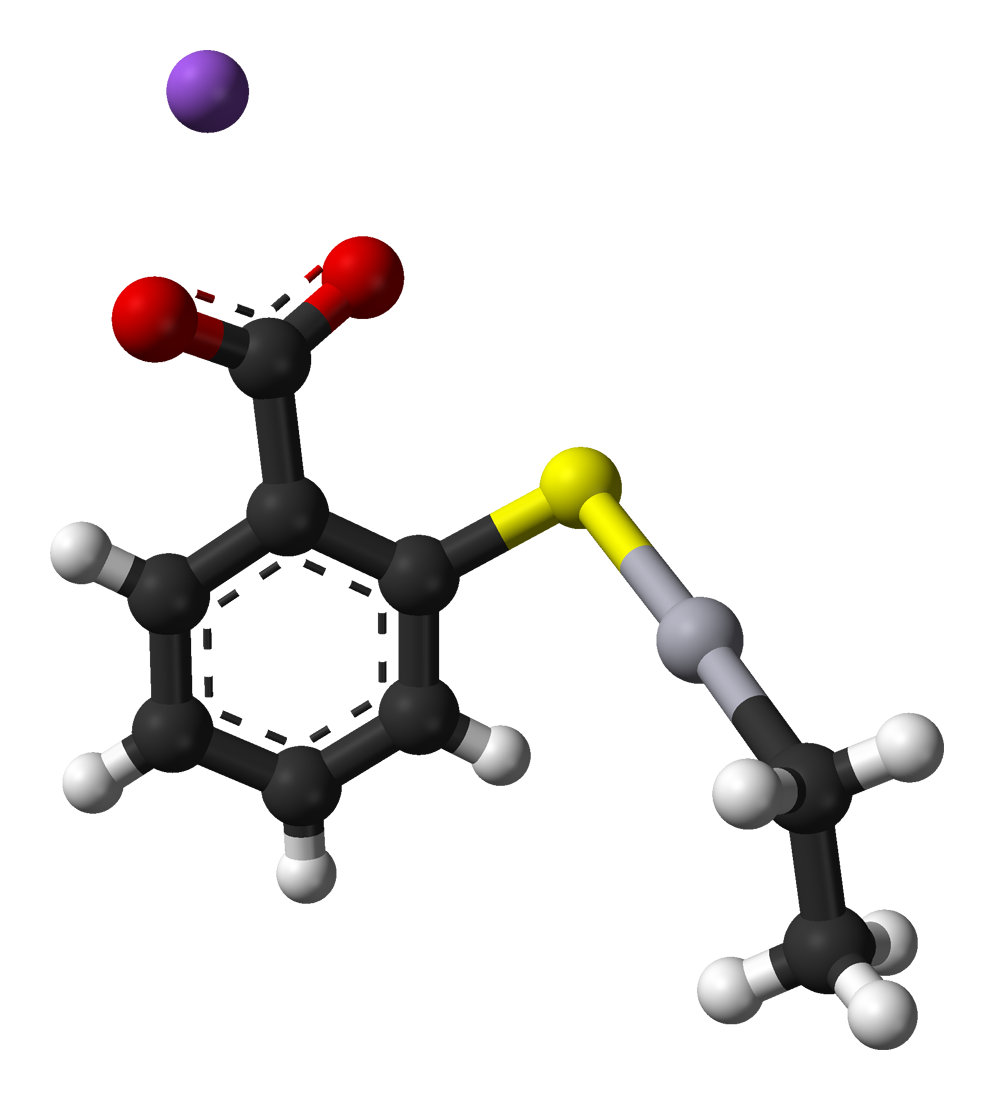

Names
- IUPAC name Ethyl(2-mercaptobenzoato-(2-)-O,S) mercurate(1-) sodium
- Other names: Mercury((o-carboxyphenyl)thio)ethyl sodium salt; sodium ethylmercurithiosalicylate; thiomersalate sodium

Identifiers
CAS Number	54-64-8
3D model (JSmol)	Interactive image
Beilstein Reference	8169555
ChEBI	CHEBI:9546
ChEMBL	ChEMBL508338
ChemSpider	10772045
DrugBank	DB11590
ECHA InfoCard	100.000.192
EC Number	200-210-4
Gmelin Reference	1677155
KEGG	D00864
PubChem CID	16684434
RTECS number	OV8400000
UNII	2225PI3MOV
CompTox Dashboard (EPA)	DTXSID3025540
- InChI: InChI=1S/C7H6O2S.C2H5.Hg.Na/c8-7(9)5-3-1-2-4-6(5)10;1-2;;/h1-4,10H,(H,8,9);1H2,2H3;;/q;;2*+1/p-2 Key: RTKIYNMVFMVABJ-UHFFFAOYSA-L; InChI=1/C7H6O2S.C2H5.Hg.Na/c8-7(9)5-3-1-2-4-6(5)10;1-2;;/h1-4,10H,(H,8,9);1H2,2H3;;/q;;2*+1/p-2/rC9H10HgO2S.Na/c1-2-10-13-8-6-4-3-5-7(8)9(11)12;/h3-6H,2H2,1H3,(H,11,12);/q;+1/p-1 Key: RTKIYNMVFMVABJ-TYXNQWANAP
- SMILES: [Na+].[O-]C(=O)c1ccccc1S[Hg]CC

Properties
Chemical formula	C_{9}H_{9}HgNaO_{2}S
Molar mass	404.81 g/mol
Appearance	White or slightly yellow powder
Density	2.508 g/cm^{3}
Melting point	232 to 233 °C (450 to 451 °F; 505 to 506 K) (decomposition)
Solubility in water	1000 g/L (20 °C)

Pharmacology
ATC code	D08AK06 (WHO)

Hazards
- GHS labelling
Pictograms	(GHS06: Toxic) (GHS08: Health hazard) (GHS09: Environmental hazard)
Signal word	Danger
Hazard statements	H300, H310, H330, H373, H410
Precautionary statements	P260, P273, P280, P301, P302, P304, P310, P330, P340, P352
NFPA 704 (fire diamond)	3 1 1
Flash point	250 °C (482 °F; 523 K)
- Lethal dose or concentration (LD, LC)
LD_{50} (median dose)	75 mg/kg (oral, rat)
Safety data sheet (SDS)	External MSDS
- Except where otherwise noted, data are given for materials in their standard state (at 25 °C [77 °F], 100 kPa). verify (what is ?) Infobox references

Thiomersal (INN), or thimerosal (USAN, JAN), also sold under the name merthiolate, is an organomercury compound. It is a well-established antiseptic and antifungal agent.

It has been used as a preservative in vaccines, immunoglobulin preparations, skin test antigens, antivenins, ophthalmic and nasal products, and tattoo inks. Despite the scientific consensus that fears about its safety are unsubstantiated, its use as a vaccine preservative has been exploited by anti-vaccination groups.

== History ==
Morris Kharasch, a chemist then at the University of Maryland, filed a patent application for thiomersal in 1927; Eli Lilly later marketed the compound under the trade name Merthiolate. In vitro tests conducted by Lilly investigators H. M. Powell and W. A. Jamieson found that it was forty to fifty times as effective as phenol against Staphylococcus aureus. It was used to kill bacteria and prevent contamination in antiseptic ointments, creams, jellies, and sprays used by consumers and in hospitals, including nasal sprays, eye drops, contact lens solutions, immunoglobulins, and vaccines. Thiomersal was used as a preservative (bactericide) so that multidose vials of vaccines could be used instead of single-dose vials, which are more expensive. By 1938, Lilly's assistant director of research listed thiomersal as one of the five most important drugs ever developed by the company.

== Synthesis ==
One of the earliest synthetic methods was a reaction between ethylmercury chloride and thiosalicylic acid in alkaline solution, with subsequent acidification. Various minor modifications of this are possible, but the modern synthesis is essentially the same.

== Structure ==
Thiomersal contains mercury(II) with a coordination number 2, i.e. two ligands are attached to Hg, the thiolate and the ethyl group. The carboxylate group confers solubility in water. Like other two-coordinate Hg(II) compounds, the coordination geometry of Hg is linear, with a 180° S-Hg-C angle. Typically, organomercury thiolate compounds are prepared from organomercury chlorides.

== Uses ==
=== Antiseptic/antifungal ===
Thiomersal's main use is as an antiseptic and antifungal agent, due to its oligodynamic effect. In multidose injectable drug delivery systems, it prevents serious adverse effects such as the Staphylococcus infection that, in one 1928 incident, killed 12 of 21 children vaccinated with a diphtheria vaccine that lacked a preservative. Unlike other preservatives at the time, such as phenol and cresol, thiomersal does not reduce the potency of the vaccines that it protects. Bacteriostatics such as thiomersal are not needed in single-dose injectables.

In the United States, the European Union, and a few other affluent countries, thiomersal is no longer used as a preservative in routine childhood vaccination schedules. In the U.S., all vaccines routinely recommended for children 6 years of age and younger are available in formulations that do not contain thiomersal. Two vaccines (a TD and the single-dose version of the trivalent influenza vaccine Fluvirin) may contain a trace of thiomersal from steps in manufacture, at less than 1 microgram of mercury per dose. The multi-dose versions of some trivalent and quadrivalent influenza vaccines can contain up to 25 micrograms of mercury per dose from thiomersal. Also, four rarely used treatments for pit viper, coral snake, and black widow venom contain thiomersal.

Outside North America and Europe, many vaccines contain thiomersal; the World Health Organization reported no evidence of toxicity from thiomersal in vaccines and no reason on safety grounds to change to more expensive single-dose administration. The United Nations Environment Program backed away from an earlier proposal of putting thiomersal on the list of banned vaccine compounds as part of its campaign to reduce mercury exposure. It stated that eliminating it in multi-dose vaccines, primarily used in developing countries, would lead to high cost and a refrigeration requirement that developing countries could ill afford. At the Minamata Convention on Mercury in 2013, thiomersal was excluded from the treaty.

== Toxicology ==
=== General toxicity ===
Thiomersal is very toxic by inhalation, ingestion, and in contact with skin (EC hazard symbol T+), with a danger of cumulative effects. It is also very toxic to aquatic organisms and may cause long-term adverse effects in aquatic environments (EC hazard symbol N).

In the body, it is metabolized or degraded to ethylmercury (C_{2}H_{5}Hg^{+}) and thiosalicylate.

Cases have been reported of severe mercury poisoning by accidental exposure or attempted suicide, with some fatalities. Animal experiments suggest that thiomersal rapidly dissociates to release ethylmercury after injection; that mercury's disposition patterns are similar to those after exposure to equivalent doses of ethylmercury chloride; and that the central nervous system and the kidneys are targets. Loss of motor coordination is a common sign. Similar signs and symptoms have been observed in accidental human poisonings. The mechanisms of toxic action are unknown.

Fecal excretion accounts for most of the elimination from the body. Ethylmercury clears from blood with a half-life of about 18 days in adults by breakdown into other chemicals, including inorganic mercury. The half-life of ethylmercury in the brains of infant monkeys is 14 days. Risk assessment for effects on the nervous system has been made by extrapolating from dose-response relationships for methylmercury. Methylmercury and ethylmercury distribute to all body tissues, crossing the blood–brain barrier and the placental barrier, and ethylmercury also moves freely throughout the body.

Concerns based on extrapolations from methylmercury caused thiomersal to be removed from U.S. childhood vaccines, starting in 1999. Later it was reported that ethylmercury is eliminated from the body and the brain significantly faster than methylmercury, so the late-1990s risk assessments turned out to be overly conservative. Though inorganic mercury metabolized from ethylmercury has a much longer half-life in the brain, at least 120 days, it appears to be much less toxic than the inorganic mercury produced from mercury vapor, for reasons not yet understood.

=== As an allergen ===
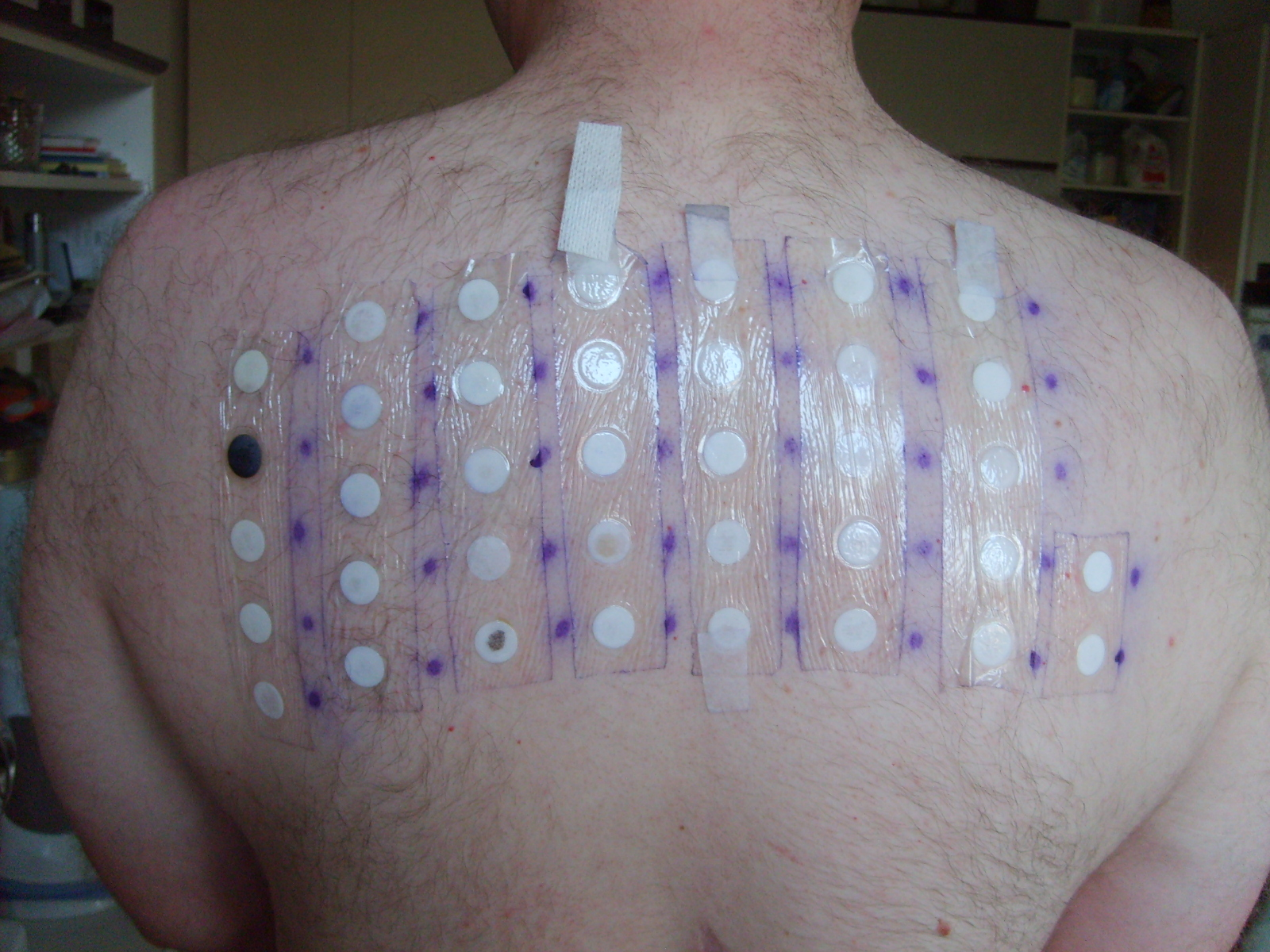
Patch test

Thiomersal is used in patch testing for people who have dermatitis, conjunctivitis, and other potentially allergic reactions. A 2007 study in Norway found that 1.9% of adults had a positive patch test reaction to thiomersal; a higher prevalence of contact allergy (up to 6.6%) was observed in German populations. Thiomersal-sensitive individuals can receive intramuscular rather than subcutaneous immunization, though there have been no large sample-sized studies regarding this matter to date. In real-world practice on vaccination of adult populations, contact allergy does not seem to elicit a clinical reaction.

Thiomersal allergy has decreased in Denmark, probably because of its exclusion from vaccines there. In a recent study of Polish children and adolescents with chronic/recurrent eczema, positive reactions to thiomersal were found in 11.7% of children (7–8 y.o.) and 37.6% of adolescents (16–17 y.o.). This difference in the sensitization rates can be explained by changing exposure patterns: The adolescents received six thiomersal-preserved vaccines during their life course, with the last immunization taking place 2–3 years before the study. Younger children received only four thiomersal-preserved vaccines, with the last one applied five years before the study, while further immunizations were performed with thiomersal-free vaccines.

=== Removal from vaccines ===
The Center for Biologics Evaluation and Research (CBER) at the FDA initiated a formal risk assessment of thiomersal in vaccines beginning in 1998. After determining the levels of ethylmercury exposure from the currently recommended vaccine schedule, the CBER found these amounts exceeded new standards for methylmercury exposure recently established by the Environmental Protection Agency. On July 7, 1999, both the American Academy of Pediatrics and the US Public Health Service issued a statement calling for the removal of thiomersal-containing vaccines "as expeditiously as possible." By March 2001, thiomersal-free versions of all the recommended childhood vaccines for children up to age 6 were available in the United States.

On June 26, 2025, the Advisory Committee on Immunization Practices (ACIP) voted in favour of recommending that most Americans receive influenza vaccines that do not contain thiomersal. United States Secretary of Health and Human Services Robert F. Kennedy Jr. adopted ACIP's recommendation on July 22, 2025, formally incorporating the removal of thiomersal from influenza vaccines into federal public health policy.

=== Disproven autism hypothesis ===
Following the phasing out of thiomersal from most U.S. and European vaccines, some parents saw the action to remove thiomersal—in the setting of a perceived increasing rate of autism as well as increasing number of vaccines in the childhood vaccination schedule—as indicating that the preservative was the cause of autism. The scientific consensus is that no evidence supports these claims, while the rate of autism continued to climb in children who did not take the thiomersal-preserved childhood vaccines.

Scientific and medical bodies such as the Institute of Medicine and World Health Organization, as well as governmental agencies such as the Food and Drug Administration and the CDC reject any role for thiomersal in autism or other neurodevelopmental disorders. Unconvinced parents attempted to treat their autistic children with unproven and possibly dangerous treatments, and refused to vaccinate them due to fears about thiomersal toxicity. Studying thiomersal potentially diverts resources away from research into more promising areas for autism. Thousands of lawsuits have been filed in U.S. federal court to seek damages from allegedly toxic vaccines, including those purportedly caused by thiomersal.

== See also ==
- Nitromersol – Organomercury antiseptic and antifungal agent, a related antimicrobial
- Phenylmercuric nitrate – Organomercury compound with powerful antiseptic and antifungal effects
