= Obesity in Nauru =

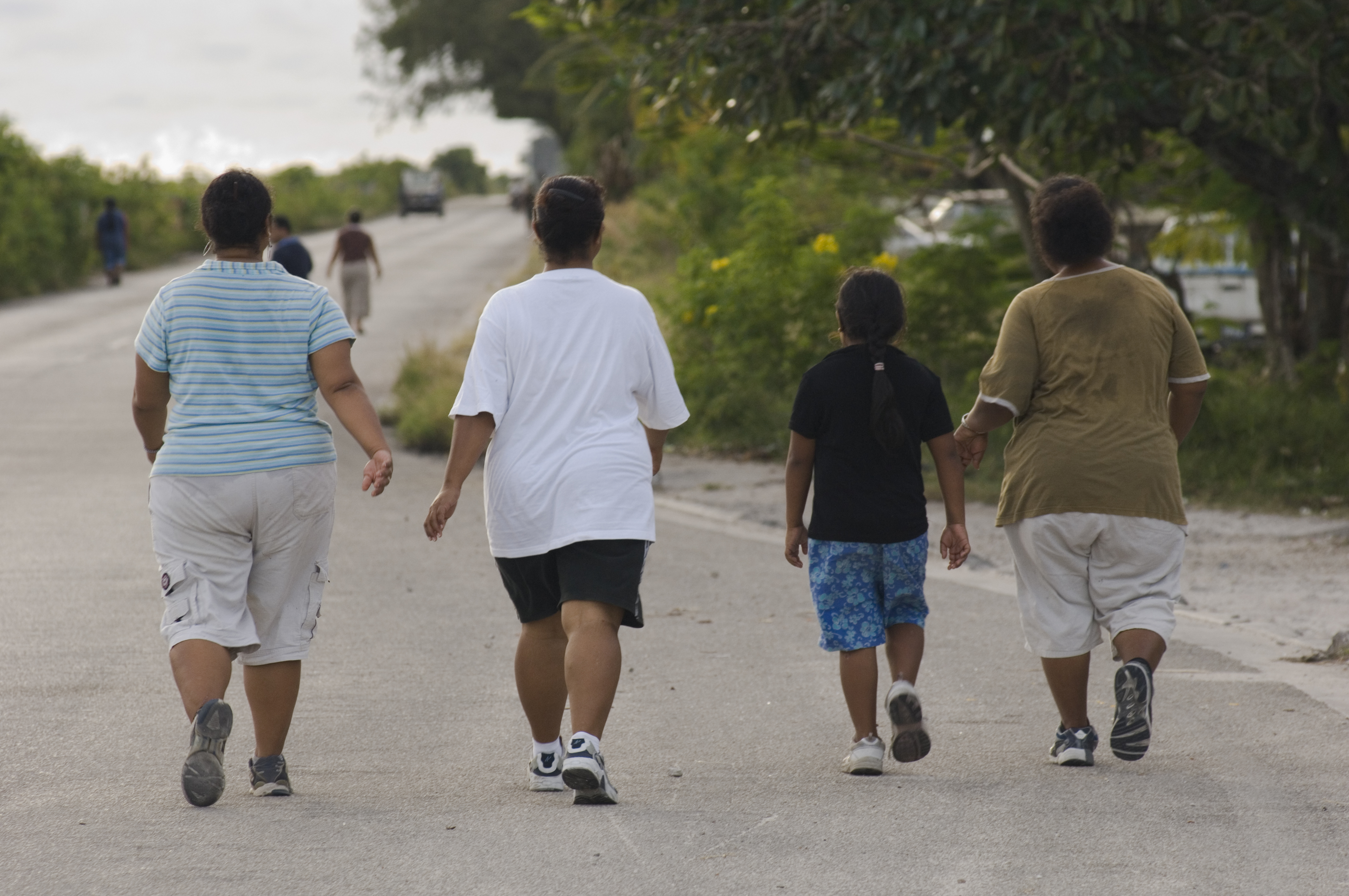
A group of Nauruans participating in a walk against diabetes around Nauru International Airport

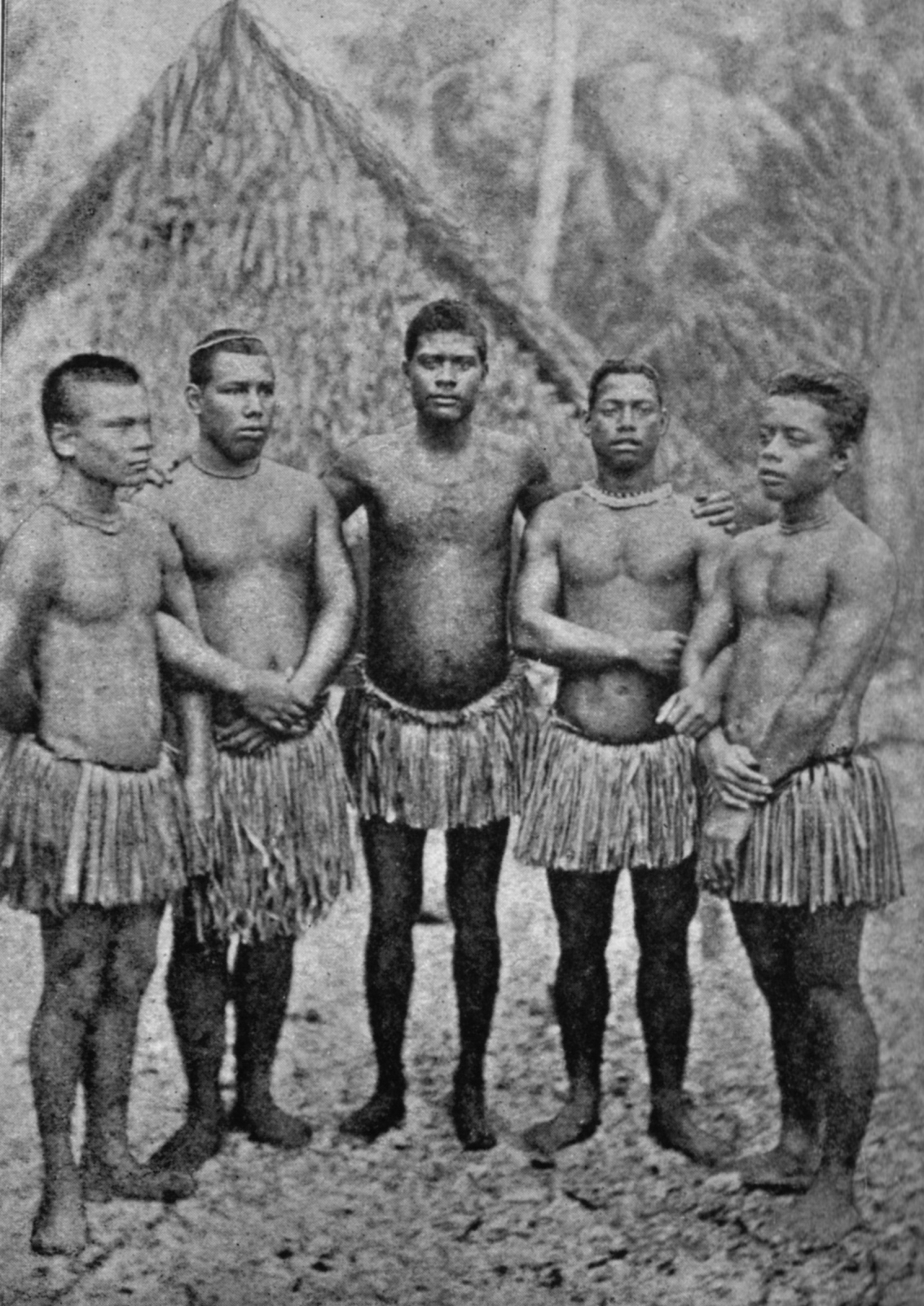
Young Nauruans in 1914

Share of adults that are obese in different countries in Oceania, 1975 to 2016

Obesity in Nauru is a major issue. The World Health Organization (WHO) has estimated that 94.5% of Nauruans are overweight or obese. Nauruans aged 27-40 years old have an average weight of more than 100 kg, with an obesity rate of 71.7%.

Nauru is known to have the highest rates of obese inhabitants worldwide. The average body weight among Nauruans is approximately 100 kilograms (220 lb). Nauru has an average BMI between 34 and 35. In 2007, World Health Organization (WHO) warned Nauru about the dangers of obesity, including heart attacks and premature death.

== Causes ==
There are multiple factors contributing to obesity in Nauru. Since the 1980s, Nauruans have led a sedentary lifestyle with an unhealthy diet, contributing to "the worst health conditions in the Pacific region."

The historical food sources of Nauruans were fishing and gardening. The traditional Nauruan diet was primarily composed of marine fish, fruits, root vegetables, and coconuts. Nauru gained independence in 1968 due to an increase in economic growth from mining activities. The garnered profits were distributed amongst the citizens, leading to an outflux in citizen labour. The Government of Nauru and WHO stated that the import of western food significantly reduced the existing culture of fishing and gardening, which led to mineral depletion and economic downturn of the nation.

Approximately 90% of the land area of Nauru is covered with phosphate deposits, with the majority strip-mined and non-arable. This has led to Nauruan reliance on processed food, high in both sugar and fat, imported from large Oceanian countries such as Australia and New Zealand.

University of Queensland professor and South Pacific researcher Clive Moore stated that obesity is mistakenly seen as a sign of wealth in Nauru.

== Consequence ==
Nauru has the highest rate of adult diabetes worldwide. The International Diabetes Federation (IDF) identified 31% of Nauruans as diabetic, with rates as high as 45% among individuals aged from 55 to 64 years. It is a small island country with the highest prevalence of type 2 diabetes in the world. 71% of the population is obese. 97% of men are overweight; the percentage of women who are overweight is only slightly lower.

As more and more money went to healthcare, less went to prevention, leading to a cycle. Nauru also suffered from poor healthcare, worsening the problem. With much of the landscape destroyed from phosphate mining, Nauru was forced to import food resources from Western countries, leading to a sharp increase in consumption of processed food. With healthy food depleted from the island, obesity rates continued to climb. Due to the cultural association of obesity with wealth, many Nauruans began to view a sedentary lifestyle as preferable to one of hard work and physical exercise, further worsening the crisis.

== Efforts to treat obesity ==
Nauruan health authorities have developed several measures to reduce obesity, such as advising people to walk around the perimeter of the Nauru International Airport, which measures to 3 miles (4.8 km) in distance. Additionally, exercise sessions and sports are regularly organised.

== See also ==
- Health in Nauru
- Epidemiology of obesity
- Obesity in the Pacific
