= St. Vincent Declaration =

The St. Vincent Declaration is a set of goals for the health care of people with diabetes mellitus published as the product of an international conference held in Saint-Vincent, Italy, on 10–12 October 1989.

== History ==
Representatives of government health departments and patients' organizations from all European countries met with diabetes experts under the aegis of the World Health Organization (WHO) Europe and the International Diabetes Federation (IDF) Europe. General standards for diabetes care were agreed on, as well as plans for improving care in participating countries toward the goals. Twenty years later, in 2009, it was stated in an editorial in the British Journal of Diabetes and Vascular Disease that 'despite the progress made following the St. Vincent Declaration and the UN Resolution, significant gaps still exist and urgent action is needed to stem this rising epidemic'.

The St Vincent Declaration has inspired other regional partnerships between the IDF and WHO, especially in response to the emerging pandemic of type 2 diabetes: the Declaration of the Americas or DOTA (1996), the Western Pacific Declaration on Diabetes (WPDD 2000), and the Declaration and Diabetes Strategy for Sub-Saharan Africa (2006). Taken collectively, these partnerships are of additional interest because, given the participation of several biomedical industry entities as co-signatories and financial contributors, they were a precursor and provided valuable learning for today’s many international and global health and development partnerships. Perhaps most importantly, these initiatives fostered the development of national diabetes programs in their respective regions. Significantly, they were also accompanied by action plans with varying levels of complexity, for example, for the WPDD this included commitment to planning, monitoring and evaluation.

The Declaration put forward a set of programmatic targets to which all member counties would aspire, and significant successes have been documented: for example, in 2006 it was reported that the St. Vincent Declaration target of reducing diabetes related blindness by one third appears to have been achieved in the Warmia and Mazury regions of Poland. Such progress has been supported by the development of DIABCARE (and its analogue QUALIDIAB as it is known in French and Spanish), an integrated information system to monitor diabetes care, according to the “gold standards” of the St Vincent Declaration Action Program. The first platform of its type for medical quality evaluation across Europe, then emulated in the Americas, it has served as a model for other chronic noncommunicable diseases and for other WHO regions. For example, this approach has been applied more recently in several Asian countries, including South Korea, Thailand, Indonesia, Malaysia, and India. Similar work has emerged from Nigeria. In Sweden, a National Diabetes Registry established in response to the St Vincent Declaration, continues to provide a tool for continuous quality assurance in diabetes care: a 2014 report notes that the original purpose, to monitor the results of performance of health centres from year to year and to compare these with national and regional means, is still the most important one, while follow-up of guidelines, treatments and complications are as important at a national level.

The St Vincent’s, Western Pacific and Africa initiatives remain fully in force, but DOTA was discontinued as a joint venture of PAHO/WHO and IDF after two 5 year planning and implementation periods. Since then, PAHO has built instead on the CARMEN network of integrated national NCD initiatives, conceived in 1995 and implemented in 1997, and the Pan American Forum for Action on NCDs (PAFNCDs), launched in 2009. Both initiatives include diabetes in a set of major non-communicable diseases. Its discontinuance by PAHO notwithstanding, monitoring and evaluation of DOTA found that it met its short term targets in most countries: preparation of national estimates of disease burden, development and implementation of national strategies and plans to deal with diabetes, and recognition of diabetes as a public health problem. Useful lessons emerged: the relevance of process-related targets to achieve short to medium term success; the value of broadly based participation in gaining recognition of a major cause of disease burden at national health policy level; wide acceptance of an integrated program model; and the critical role of having a Ministry staff member designated in each country as a managerial focal point. The initiative stimulated development of national guidelines to improve clinical management, diabetes education and nutrition, the defining of minimum acceptable standards of care, enhanced regional training and information sharing, and the implementation in several countries of a quality of care management system.

In 2012, the International Diabetes Federation released the 5th edition of the IDF Diabetes Atlas. In this it is noted that estimates published in the 4th edition were instrumental in providing the evidence to drive the unanimous adoption of the resolution for the September 2011 UN High-level Meeting on non-communicable diseases. In the 5th edition, the estimated number of adults living with diabetes is given as 366 million, representing 8.3% of the global adult population. This number is projected to increase to 552 million people by 2030, or 9.9% of adults. These estimates are considerably higher than those reported in the 4th edition, largely due to new data from China, the Middle East, and Africa.

== See also ==
- Epidemiology of diabetes mellitus
- World Diabetes Day
- National Diabetes Education Program
