= World Diabetes Day =

Global awareness campaign

- Logo
- Observed by: Worldwide
- Date: November 14

World Diabetes Day (WDD) is the primary global awareness campaign focusing on diabetes mellitus and is held on 14 November each year.

WDD is led by the International Diabetes Federation (IDF), and each World Diabetes Day focuses on a theme related to diabetes. Type 2 diabetes is a largely preventable and treatable non-communicable disease that is rapidly increasing in numbers worldwide. Type 1 diabetes is not preventable but can be managed with insulin injections. Topics covered have included diabetes and human rights, diabetes and lifestyle, diabetes and obesity, diabetes in the disadvantaged and the vulnerable, and diabetes in children and adolescents. While the campaigns last the whole year, the day itself marks the birthday of Frederick Banting who, along with Charles Best, first conceived the idea which led to the discovery of insulin in 1922.

== History ==
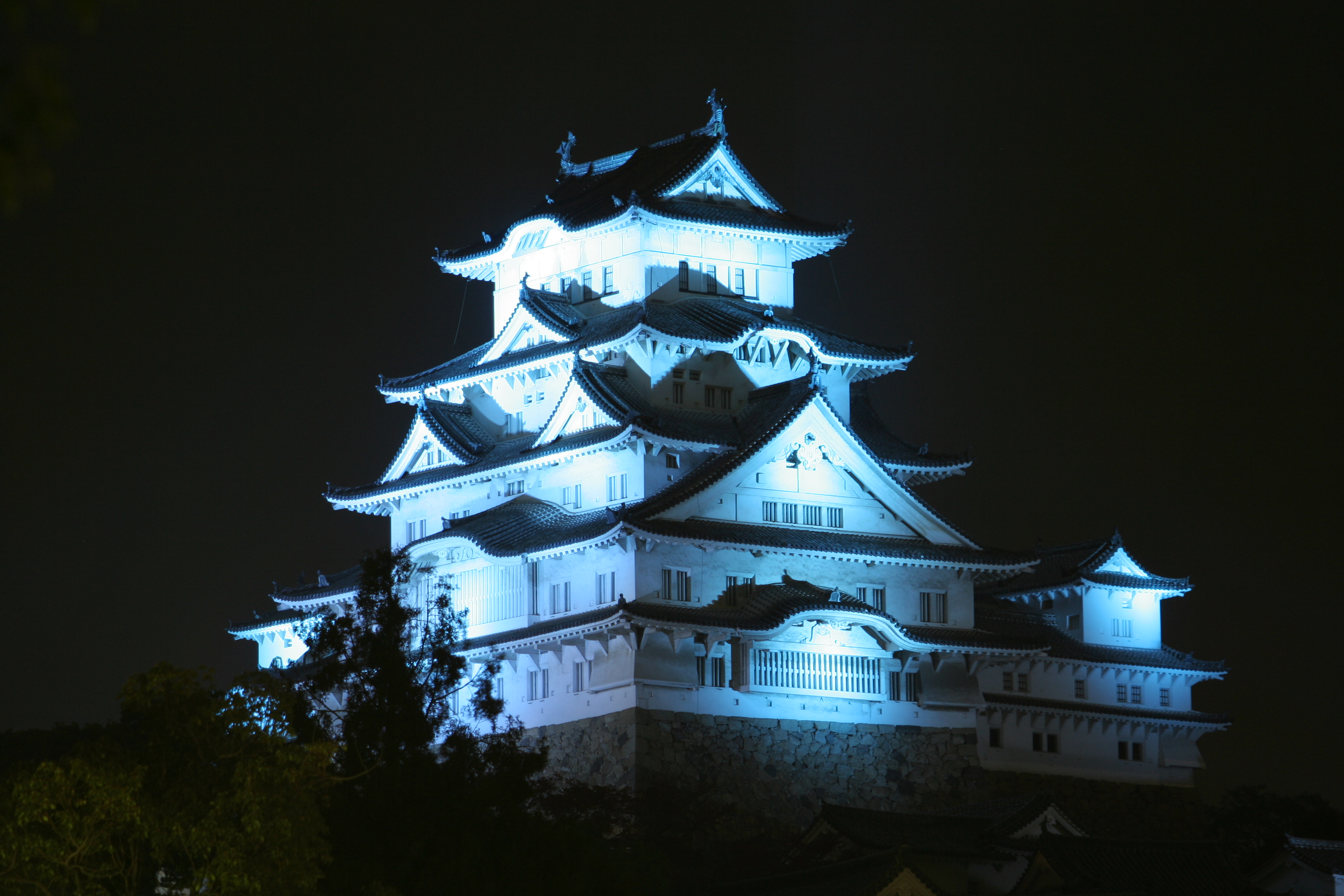
Himeji Castle lit up for World Diabetes Day in 2008

World Diabetes Day was launched in 1991 by the International Diabetes Federation and the World Health Organization (WHO) in response to the rapid increase of diabetes cases around the world.

Resolution adopted by the General Assembly on 20 December 2006 (A/61/L.39/Rev.1 and Add.1) 61/225 for World Diabetes Day

By 2016, over 230 IDF Member Associations in more than 160 countries and territories were commemorating World Diabetes Day. IDF Member Associations were joined by international organizations, companies, healthcare professionals, politicians, celebrities, and people living with diabetes and their families. Activities on WDD include diabetes screening programs, radio and television campaigns, and sports events.

=== Themes of World Diabetes Day ===
The theme of the previous World Diabetes Day from 2021–2023 was access to Diabetes care.

- The theme for World Diabetes Day 2024–26 is Diabetes and Well-being. Over the next three years, the World Diabetes Day campaign will focus on:
1. Physical well-being
2. Societal well-being
3. Mental well-being

- 2024-2026: Diabetes and Well-being.
- 2021–2023: Access to Diabetes Care.
- 2020: The Nurse and Diabetes.
- 2018–2019: The Family and Diabetes – diabetes concerns every family.
- 2017: Women and diabetes – our right to a healthy future.
- 2016: Eyes on Diabetes.
- 2015: Healthy Eating.
- 2014: Go Blue for Breakfast.
- 2013: Protect our Future: Diabetes Education and Prevention.

== See also ==
- St. Vincent Declaration
- Epidemiology of diabetes mellitus
- World Health Day 2016: Beat Diabetes (WHO)
