= Obesogen =

Foreign chemical compound that disrupts lipid balance causing obesity

Bisphenol A found in food and beverage packaging is an obesogen showing up in the bodies of about 95% of the human population.

Obesogens are certain chemical compounds that are hypothesised to disrupt normal development and balance of lipid metabolism, which in some cases, can lead to obesity. Obesogens may be functionally defined as chemicals that inappropriately alter lipid homeostasis and fat storage, change metabolic setpoints, disrupt energy balance or modify the regulation of appetite and satiety to promote fat accumulation and obesity.

There are many different proposed mechanisms through which obesogens can interfere with the body's adipose tissue biology. These mechanisms include alterations in the action of metabolic sensors; dysregulation of sex steroid synthesis, action or breakdown; changes in the central integration of energy balance including the regulation of appetite and satiety; and reprogramming of metabolic setpoints. Some of these proposed pathways include inappropriate modulation of nuclear receptor function which therefore allows the compounds to be classified as endocrine disrupting chemicals that act to mimic hormones in the body, altering the normal homeostasis maintained by the endocrine system.

Obesogens have been detected in the body both as a result of intentional administration of obesogenic chemicals in the form of pharmaceutical drugs such as diethylstilbestrol, selective serotonin reuptake inhibitors, and thiazolidinedione and as a result of unintentional exposure to environmental obesogens such as tributyltin, bisphenol A, diethylhexylphthalate, and perfluorooctanoate.

The term obesogen was coined in 2006 by Felix Grün and Bruce Blumberg of the University of California, Irvine.

== Mechanisms of action ==
There are many ways in which obesogenic drugs and chemicals can disrupt the body's adipose tissue biology. The three main mechanisms of action include

- alterations in the action of metabolic sensors in which obesogens mimic metabolic ligands acting to either block or upregulate hormone receptors
- dysregulation of sex steroid synthesis, in which they alter the ratio of sex hormones leading to changes in their control of lipid balance
- changes in the central integration of energy balance including the regulation of appetite and satiety in the brain and the reprogramming of metabolic setpoints.

=== Metabolic sensors ===
Obesogenic drugs and chemicals have been shown to target transcription regulators found in gene networks that function to control intracellular lipid homeostasis and proliferation and differentiation on adipocytes. The major group of regulators that is targeted is a group of nuclear hormone receptors known as peroxisome proliferator activated receptors (PPARα, δ, and γ). These hormone receptors sense a variety of metabolic ligands including lipophilic hormones, dietary fatty acids and their metabolites, and, depending on the varying levels of these ligands, control transcription of genes involved in balancing the changes in lipid balance in the body. To become active and properly function as metabolic sensors and transcription regulators, the PPAR receptors must heterodimerize with another receptor known as the 9-cis retinoic acid receptor (RXR). The RXR receptor itself is the second major target of obesogens next to the PPAR receptors.

The PPARα receptor, when complexed with RXR and activated by the binding of a lipid, promotes peroxisome proliferation leading to increased fatty acid β-oxidation. Substances, such a xenobiotics that target and act as agonists of PPARα, typically act to reduce overall serum concentrations of lipids. In contrast, the PPARγ receptor, when complexed with RXR and activated by the binding of fatty acids or their derivatives, promotes lipid biosynthesis and storage of lipids is favored over fatty acid oxidation. In addition, activation promotes differentiation of preadipocytes and the conversion of mesenchymal progenitor cells to preadipocytes in adipose tissues. Substances that target and act as agonists of PPARγ/RXR complex typically act to increase overall serum concentrations of lipids.

Obesogens that target the PPARγ/RXR complex mimic the metabolic ligands and activate the receptor leading to upregulation of lipid accumulation which explains their obesogenic effects. However, in the case of obesogens that target the PPARα/RXR complex, which when stimulated reduces adipose mass and body weight, there are a few explanations as to how they promote obesity.

The ligand binding pockets of PPARs are very large and unspecified, allowing for different isoforms of the receptor (PPARα, δ, and γ) to be activated by the same agonist ligands or their metabolites. In addition, fatty acid oxidation stimulated by PPARα requires continuous stimulation while only a single activation event of PPARγ is required to permanently increase adipocyte differentiation and number. Therefore, it may be the case that metabolites of PPARα targeting obesogens are also activating PPARγ, providing the single activation event needed to potentially lead to a pro-adipogenic response.

A second explanation points to specific PPARα targeters that have been shown to additionally cause abnormal transcriptional regulation of testicular steroidogenesis when introduced during fetal development. This abnormal regulation leads to a decreased level of androgen in the body which, itself, is obesogenic.

Finally, if PPARα activation occurs during critical periods of development, the resulting decrease in lipid concentration in the developing fetus is recognized by the fetal brain as undernourishment. In this case, the developing brain makes what will become permanent changes to the body's metabolic control, leading to long-term upregulation of lipid storage and maintenance.

=== Sex steroid dysregulation ===
Sex steroids normally play a significant role in lipid balance in the body. Aided by other peptide hormones such as growth hormone, they act against the lipid accumulation mediated by insulin and cortisol by mobilizing lipid stores that are present. Exposure to obesogens often leads to a deficiency or change in the ratio between androgen and estrogen sex steroid levels, which modifies this method of lipid balance resulting in lowered growth hormone secretion, hypocortisolemia (low levels of circulating cortisol), and increased resistance to insulin effects.

This alteration in sex steroid levels due to obesogens can vary enormously according to both the sex of the exposed individual as well as the timing of the exposure. If the chemicals are introduced at critical windows of development, the vulnerability of an individual to their effects is much higher than if exposure occurs later in adulthood. It has been shown that obesogenic effects are apparent in female mice exposed to both phytoestrogens and DES during their neonatal periods of development, as they, though born with a lower birth weight, almost always developed obesity, high leptin levels, and altered glucose response pathways. Both phytoestrogen and DES exposed male mice did not develop obesity and, rather, showed decreased body weights with increased exposure confirming the role of gender differences in exposure response. Further studies have shown positive correlations for serum BPA levels with obese females in the human population, along with other xenoestrogen compounds suggesting the parallel roles that these effects may be having on humans.

=== Central balance of energy ===
While hormone receptors tend to be the most obvious candidates for targets of obesogens, central mechanisms that balance and regulate the body's nutritional changes on a day-to-day basis as a whole cannot be overlooked. The HPA axis (hypothalamic-pituitary-adrenal) is involved in controlling appetite and energy homeostasis circuits which are mediated by a large number of monoaminoergic, peptidergic (use of hormones as neurotransmitters), and endocannabinoid signals that come from the digestive tract, adipose tissues, and from within the brain. It is these types of signals that provide a likely target for obesogens that have shown to have weight altering effects.

==== Neuroendocrine effects ====
Neurological disorders may enhance the susceptibility to develop the metabolic syndrome that includes obesity. Many neuropharmaceuticals used to alter behavioral pathways in patients with neurological disorders have shown to have metabolic altering side-effects leading to obesogenic phenotypes as well. These findings give evidence to conclude that an increase in lipid accumulation can result from the targeting of neurotransmitter receptors by foreign chemicals.

==== Peptidergic hormones ====
Several peptidergic hormone pathways controlling appetite and energy balance —such as those involving ghrelin, neuropeptide Y, and agouti-related peptide — are particularly sensitive to changes in nuclear receptor signaling pathways and can therefore be easily altered by the introduction of endocrine disruptors. Such an alteration can lead to induced feelings of hunger and decreased feelings of fullness causing an increase in food intake and inability to feel satisfied, both characteristic of obesity.

Some xenoestrogens such as BPA, nonylphenol, and DEHP have all shown to act is this way, altering NPY expression and significantly shifting the feeding behaviors of exposed mice. In addition, organotins such as trimethyltin (TMT), triethyltin (TET), and tributyltin (TBT) compounds can exert their effects through similar pathways. TBT can locally disrupt aromatase regulation in the hypothalamus causing the responses of the HPA axis to hormones to become abnormal. TMT works in a similar but unique way, inducing NPY and NPY2 receptor expression initially which later is counteracted by neuronal degeneration in lesions causing decrease in signaling ability.

While an increase in food intake is often the case after exposure, weight gain involves the body's maintenance of its metabolic setpoint as well. Given this information, it is particularly important to note that exposure during development and initial programming of these setpoints can be extremely significant throughout the remainder of life.

==== Endocannabinoid signaling ====
A wide range of environmental organotins that mimic petidergic hormones in the HPA axis as mentioned before, additionally mimic lipid activators of the cannabinoid system and inhibit AMPK activity. Endocannaboid levels are high in those suffering from obesity due to hyperactivity of cannaboid signalling pathways. It is these high levels that have been found to be closely associated with increased fat stores linking the lipid activator mimics to the actual disease.

==== Programming of metabolic set points ====
Regions in the hypothalamus control the responses that establish an individual's metabolic setpoint and metabolic efficiency. These responses are adaptive in that they vary according to the individual's needs, always working to restore the metabolic setpoint through the increase or decrease of metabolic functions depending on varying energy needs. Since it is adapted, it is expected that it would be able to achieve equilibrium if the lipid balance was altered by hormones via the mechanisms mentioned above. However, since obesogenic phenotypes persist, it can be concluded that adaptive response components of the hypothalamus may be a target of obesogens as well.

Body composition is very much predetermined before birth and changes rarely occur in adulthood. Adipocyte numbers increase during development and come to a plateau, after which adipocytes are restricted to mostly hypertrophic growth and don't seem to change much in cell number. This is demonstrated by the difficulty in altering somatotypes or more simply by the difficulty that goes along with trying to lose weight past a certain point.

A particular study on polybrominated diphenyl ethers (PBDE), a commonly used chemical in flame retardants, made its role in altering the functions of the thyroid hormone axis apparent. This finding leads to increased concern as neonatal thyroid status plays a large role in the integration of maternal environmental signals during development in the womb that is used for long-term body weight programming.

== Pharmaceutical obesogens ==
Obesogens detection in the body and resulting obesogenic effects can result as side effects from intentional administration of obesogenic chemicals in the form of pharmaceutical drugs. These pharmaceutical obesogens can show their effects through a variety of targets.

=== Metabolic sensors ===
Thiazolidinediones (TZD), rosiglitazone, and pioglitazone are all used to treat diabetes. These drugs act as agonists of the PPAR-γ receptor leading to insulin sensitizing effects that can improve glycemic control and serum triglyceride levels. Despite the positive effects these chemicals can have in treating diabetes patients, administration also lead to unwanted PPAR-γ mediated side effects such as peripheral edema which can be followed by persistent weight gain if the drug is used over a long period of time. These side effects are particularly prominent in diabetes 2 patients, a disease that tends to result from an overabundance of adipose tissue.

=== Sex steroid dysregulation ===
Diethylstilbestrol (DES) is a synthetic estrogen that was once prescribed to women to decrease the risk of miscarriage until it was found to be causing abnormalities in exposed offspring. This same chemical has been shown to cause weight gain in female mice when exposed during neonatal development. While exposure didn't lead to an abnormal birth weight, significant weight gain occurred much later in adulthood.

=== Central integration of energy balance ===
Selective serotonin reuptake inhibitors (SSRI) (e.g. paroxetine), tricyclic antidepressants (e.g. amitriptyline), tetracyclic antidepressants (e.g. mirtazapine) and atypical antipsychotics (e.g. clozapine) are all neuropharmaceuticals that target neurotransmitter receptors that are involved with brain circuits that regulate behavior. Often the function of these receptors overlaps with metabolism regulation, such as that of the H1 receptor which when activated decreases AMPK activity. As a result, the administration of these drugs can have side effects including increased lipid accumulation that can result in obesity.

=== Metabolic setpoints ===
The mechanisms behind SSRI, tricyclic antidepressants, and atypical antipsychotics function allow them all to have potential roles in the alteration of metabolic setpoints. TZD, in particular has been linked to regulatory function in the HPT axis, however, no conclusive evidence has been determined thus far and further research is required to confirm these hypotheses.

== Environmental obesogens ==
While obesogens can be introduced to the body intentionally via administration of obesogenic pharmaceuticals, exposure can also occur through chemical exposure to obesogens found in the environment such as organotins and xenobiotics.

=== Organotins ===
Particular members of the organotin class of persistent organic pollutants (POPs), namely tributyltin (TBT) and triphenyltin (TPT) are highly selective and act as very potent agonists of both the retinoid X receptors (RXR α,β, and γ) and PPARγ. This ability to target both receptors at the same time, is more effective than single receptor activation, as adopogenic signaling can be mediated through both components of the heterodimer complex. This highly effective activation mechanism can pose detrimental, long-term adipogenic effects especially if exposure occurs during development and early life.

Organotins (tin-based chemicals), used in marine anti-fouling paints, wood catalysts, plasticizers, slimicides, in industrial water systems, and fungicides on food have recently been linked to obesogenic properties when introduced in the body. Human exposure to these major environmental sources most commonly occurs through ingestion of contaminated seafood, agricultural products, and drinking water as well as from exposure to leaching from plastics.

Although studies that have directly measured organotin levels in human tissue and blood are limited, it has been determined that vulnerability of a portion of the general population to organotin exposure at levels high enough to activate RXRs and PPARγ receptors is very probable. The high usage of organotins in both plastics and agricultural maintenance as well as the high affinity of the chemicals further confirms this conclusion.

Liver samples from the late 1990s in Europe and Asia contained on average 6 and 84 ng/g wet wt respectively for total organotin levels, while later studies found levels of total organotins in US blood samples averaged around 21 ng/mL with TBT comprising around 8 ng/mL (~ 27 nM). Even more recent analyses of European blood samples found the predominant species to be TPT rather than TBT at 0.09 and 0.67 ng/mL (~0.5-2 nM). Only occasional trace amounts of TBT were found. These results indicate that organtin exposure to humans, while found to be present among many different populations, can vary in terms of type of organatin and level of exposure from region to region.

=== Other xenobiotics ===
Other common xenobiotics found in the environment have been shown to have PPAR activity, posing even further threats to dysregulated metabolic balance. BPA from polycarbonate plastics, phthalate plasticizers used to soften PVC plastics, and various perfluoroalkyl compounds (PFCs) that are widely used surfactants and surface repellents in consumer products are all potentially obesogenic when introduced in the body. Phthalates and PFCs in particular have been found to function as agonists for one or more of the PPARs Additionally, metabolites of DHEP such as MEHP also activate PPARγ leading to a proadipogenic response.

== Public health implications ==
Although research on endocrine disruptors or "obesogens" is still emerging, the public health implications so far have mainly surrounded obesity, diabetes, and cardiovascular disease. Obesity has become a pandemic, increasing for all population groups. From 1980 to 2008, the rates of obesity have doubled for adults and tripled for children. In the U.S. alone, it has been estimated that almost 100 million individuals are obese. Traditional thinking suggested that diet and exercise alone were the main contributors to obesity; however, current experimental evidence shows that obesogens might be part of the cause.

Obesity may lead to potentially debilitating chronic diseases such as diabetes, and certain environmental exposures, or obesogens, have been directly linked to Type II diabetes mellitus (T2DM).

=== Potential obesogens in everyday life ===
Obesogens can be found in many things, from water bottles to microwaveable popcorn, and from nonstick pans to shower curtains. People interact with them on a daily basis, both intentionally and unintentionally, at work, school and home. They are an unnecessary and mostly preventable potential hazard to health, which can have a large impact on how individuals gain and lose weight.

Bisphenol-A (BPA) is an industrial chemical and organic compound that has been used in the production of plastics and resins for over a half-century. It is used in products such as toys, medical devices, plastic food and beverage containers, shower curtains, dental sealants and compounds, and register receipts. BPA has been shown to seep into food sources from containers or into the body just by handling products made from it. Certain researchers suggest that BPA actually decreases the fat cell count in the body, but at the same time increasing the size of the ones remaining; therefore, no difference in weight is shown, and an individual is even likely to gain more.

Nicotine is a chemical found in tobacco products and certain insecticides. As an obesogen, nicotine mostly acts on prenatal development after maternal smoking occurs. A strong association has been made between maternal smoking and childhood overweight/obesity, with nicotine as the single causal agent.

Arsenic is a metalloid (i.e., an element with some metallic properties) found in and on most naturally occurring substances on Earth. It can be found in the soil, ground water, air, and in small concentrations in food. Arsenic has many applications such as in the production of insecticides, herbicides, pesticides and electronic devices. The development of diabetes has been linked to arsenic exposure from drinking water and occupational contact.

Pesticides are substances used to prevent, destroy, repel or mitigate pests, and they have been used throughout all of recorded history. Some pesticides persist for short periods of time and some for long periods of time which are considered persistent organic pollutants (POPs). Several cross-sectional studies have shown pesticides as obesogens, linking them to obesity, diabetes and other morbidities.

Some pharmaceutical drugs are also potentially obesogens. From 2005 to 2008, 11% of Americans aged 12 and over took antidepressant medications. Certain antidepressants, known as selective serotonin reuptake inhibitors (SSRIs), are potentially adding to the almost 100 million obese individuals in the U.S. A key function of SSRI antidepressants is to regulate the serotonin reuptake transporter (SERT) which can affect food intake and lipid accumulation leading to obesity.

Organotins such as tributyltin (TBT) and triphenyltin (TPT) are endocrine disruptors that have been shown to increase triglyceride storage in adipocytes. Although they have been widely used in the marine industry since the 1960s, other common sources of human exposure include contaminated seafood and shellfish, fungicides on crops and as antifungal agents used in wood treatments, industrial water systems and textiles. Organotins are also being used in the manufacture of PVC plastics and have been identified in drinking water and food supplies.

Perfluorooctanoic acid (PFOA) is a surfactant used for reduction of friction, and it is also used in nonstick cookware. PFOA has been detected in the blood of more than 98% of the general US population. It is a potential endocrine disruptor. Animal studies have shown that prenatal exposure to PFOA is linked to obesity when reaching adulthood.

== Future research ==
Most of the environmental obesogens currently identified are either classified into the category of chemical mimics of metabolic hormones throughout the body or of neurotransmitters within the brain. Because they fall into these two categories, extensive opportunities for complex interactions and varied sites of action as well as multiple molecular targets are open for consideration. Changing dose ranges tend to result in varying phenotypes and timing of exposure, gender, and gender predisposition introduce even more levels of complexity in how these substances effect the human body.

Because the mechanisms behind the different effects of obesogens are so complex and not well understood, the extent to which they play in the current obesity epidemic may be greater than once thought. Epigenetic changes due to obesogen exposure must also be considered as a possibility, as they open up the potential for misregulated metabolic functions to be passed on from generation to generation. Epigenetic processes via hypermethylation of regulatory regions could lead to overexpression of different proteins, and therefore, amplification of acquired environmental effects. Research will be required in order to gain a better understanding of the mechanism of action these chemicals are involved in before the extent of the risk of exposure can be determined and methods of prevention and removal from the environment can be established.

== Natural occurring obesogens ==
Fructose is a natural occurring obesogen found in several food products. It increases the development of diabetes as well as increasing the amount of fat stored in the liver which results in weight gain. It is found in sweets and sweetened beverages.

Genistein is a naturally occurring obesogen found in soy bean and soy products. Genestein has been found to decrease mammary tumors in animal models. Genestein belongs to a family of phytoestrogens. Phytoestrogens are used to help humans with menopausal relief and the prevention of hormonal cancers.

== Obesogen prevention ==
Preventing the effects of obesogen in the human body is crucial for maintaining healthy body weights. A few ways individuals can proactively reverse the effects would be regularly exercising, maintaining a healthy diet, ensuring quality sleep, and managing stress levels. These few options that allow individuals to practice healthy habits will in turn reduce the effects of obesogen within the body.

== See also ==
- Bariatrics
- Obesity
- Childhood obesity
- Orexigenic
- Epidemiology of obesity
- Epidemiology of childhood obesity
