= Socioeconomic mobility in the United States =

Social and economic class mobility

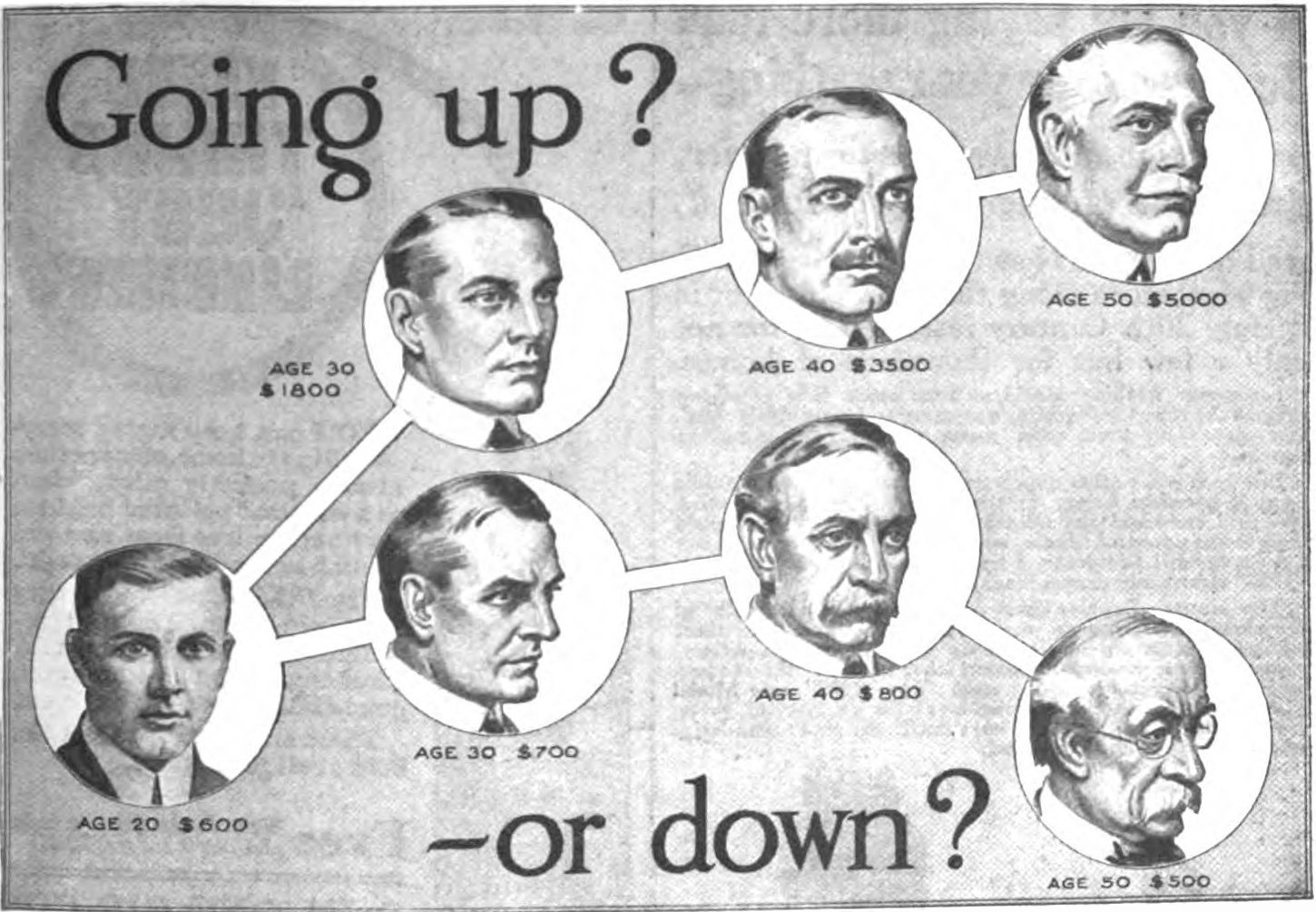
Illustration from a 1916 advertisement for a vocational school in the back of a US magazine. Education has been seen as a key to socioeconomic mobility, and the advertisement appealed to Americans' belief in the possibility of self-betterment as well as threatening the consequences of downward mobility in the great income inequality existing during the Industrial Revolution.

Raj Chetty... ha[s] pieced together an astonishing series of findings: that absolute mobility (the chance that a child will go on to earn more than their parents) has dropped from 90%, a near certainty, to 50%, a coin-toss; that the gap in life-expectancy between rich and poor has widened even as that between blacks and whites has narrowed; and that although the chances of upward mobility differ greatly from one neighbourhood to the next, in nearly every part of America the path for black boys is steeper.

— The Economist, 2020

Socioeconomic mobility in the United States refers to the upward or downward movement of Americans from one social class or economic level to another, through job changes, inheritance, marriage, connections, tax changes, innovation, illegal activities, hard work, lobbying, luck, health changes or other factors.

This mobility can be the change in socioeconomic status between parents and children ("inter-generational"); or over the course of a person's lifetime ("intra-generational"). Socioeconomic mobility typically refers to "relative mobility", the chance that an individual American's income or social status will rise or fall in comparison to other Americans, but can also refer to "absolute" mobility, based on changes in living standards in America.

Several studies have found that inter-generational mobility is lower in the US than in some European countries, in particular the Nordic countries. The US ranked 27th in the world in the 2020 Global Social Mobility Index.

Social mobility in the US has either remained unchanged or decreased since the 1970s.

A 2008 study showed that economic mobility in the U.S. increased from 1950 to 1980, but has declined sharply since 1980. A 2012 study conducted by the Pew Charitable Trusts found that the bottom quintile is 57% likely to experience upward mobility and only 7% to experience downward mobility. A 2013 Brookings Institution study found income inequality was increasing and becoming more permanent, sharply reducing social mobility. A large academic study released in 2014 found US mobility overall has not changed appreciably in the last 25 years (for children born between 1971 and 1996), but a variety of up and down mobility changes were found in several different parts of the country. On average, American children entering the labor market today have the same chances of moving up in the income distribution (relative to their parents) as children born in the 1970s.

== Popular perception ==
Many Americans strongly believe the U.S. is a "Land of Opportunity" that offers every child an equal chance at social mobility and economic mobility. The idea of Americans rising from humble origins to riches has been called a "civil religion", "the bedrock upon which the American story has been anchored", and part of the American identity (the American Dream.) This theme is celebrated in the lives of famous Americans such as Benjamin Franklin and Henry Ford, and in popular culture (from the books of Horatio Alger and Norman Vincent Peale to the song "Movin' on Up").

In the US only 32% of respondents agreed with the statement that forces beyond their personal control determine their success. In contrast, a majority of European respondents agreed with this view in every country but three (Britain, the Czech Republic and Slovakia). The Brookings Institution found Americans surveyed had the highest belief in meritocracy—69% agreed with the statement "people are rewarded for intelligence and skill"—among 27 nations surveyed. In a survey from the Cato Institute, these findings were consistent across income levels, but not political ideology, with strong liberals more likely to attribute success to luck or family.

Another report found such beliefs to have gotten stronger over the last few decades. The Journal of Experimental Social Psychology posits that part of the reason for American's strong belief in economic mobility is due to a strong underestimation about current economic inequality. High levels of perceived economic equality lead to attributing wealth to more internal factors like work ethic, thus leading to a higher belief in economic mobility.

Measurements of American perception of economic mobility have not been consistent. Two research articles from the Association for Psychological Science were released January and February of 2015, both surveying respondent estimation of American economic mobility. Both papers came to opposite conclusions - one stating that Americans tend to underestimate upward mobility, and the other stating that Americans overstate upward mobility. A study published by Cambridge University found that the wording in each study's questionnaire was strongly determinative of the results, biasing them depending on which questions were given. Researchers concluded that due to the limited prior knowledge or attitudes typical respondents had on the subject, especially with the formatting of "quintiles", responses were far more vulnerable to be changed by the wording of the questions.

== Intergenerational mobility ==
If Americans want to live the American dream, they should go to Denmark.

— Richard G. Wilkinson at a 2011 TED conference on economic inequality.

=== Current state ===
The correlation between parents' income and their children's income in the United States is estimated between .4 and .6.

If a parent's income had no effect on a child's opportunity for future upward mobility, and was not correlated with other factors impacting it, approximately 20% of poor children who started in the bottom quintile (in the bottom 20% of the US range of incomes) would remain there as poor adults. At the other end of income spectrum, if children were born into wealthy families in the top 20%, only 20% would stay in that top income category if their mobility opportunities were equal to every other child's in the country.

But long-term income statistics show this isn't happening. Mobility opportunities are different for poor and wealthy children in the US. Parental incomes and parental choices of home locations while raising children appear to be major factors in that difference. According to a 2012 Pew Economic Mobility Project study 43% of children born into the bottom quintile (bottom 20%) remain in that bottom quintile as adults. Similarly, 40% of children raised in the top quintile (top 20%) will remain there as adults. Looking at larger moves, only 4% of those raised in the bottom quintile moved up to the top quintile as adults. Around twice as many (8%) of children born into the top quintile fell to the bottom. 37% of children born into the top quintile will fall below the middle. These findings have led researchers to conclude that "opportunity structures create and determine future generations' chances for success. Hence, our lot in life is at least partially determined by where we grow up, and this is partially determined by where our parents grew up, and so on."

Economic mobility may be affected by factors such as geographic location, education, genetics, culture, race, sex, and interactions among these, as well as family wealth.

Economic mobility has fallen between 1850 and 2019, where a fathers' economic rank more weakly predicts a child's rank after World War II than during the 19th and early 20th Centuries. Intergenerational mobility was low in part due to limited upward mobility for poorer individuals who lived in the South or were Black.

=== Famous historical cases ===
Famous instances of great economic and social mobility include Benjamin Franklin and Henry Ford. Additional popular examples of upward social mobility between generations in America include Abraham Lincoln and Bill Clinton, who were born into working-class families yet achieved high political office in adult life. Andrew Carnegie arrived in the U.S. as a poor immigrant and rose to become a steel tycoon, perhaps the wealthiest man in America, and its leading philanthropist.

=== Comparisons with other countries ===
Intergenerational income elasticities for nine developed countries (showing what a percentage increase in an adults income has as a percentage of the child's later income)

Several large studies of mobility in developed countries in recent years have found the US among the lowest in mobility. One study (“Do Poor Children Become Poor Adults?") found that of nine developed countries, the United States and United Kingdom had the lowest intergenerational vertical social mobility with about half of the advantages of having a parent with a high income passed on to the next generation. The four countries with the lowest "intergenerational income elasticity", i.e. the highest social mobility, were Denmark, Norway, Finland, and Canada with less than 20% of advantages of having a high income parent passed on to their children. (see graph) Nobel Prize-winning economist Joseph Stiglitz contends that "Scandinavian countries changed their education systems, social policies and legal frameworks to create societies where there is a higher degree of mobility. That made their countries more into the land of opportunity that America once was."

According to journalist Jason DeParle, "At least five large studies in recent years have found the United States to be less mobile than comparable nations. A project led by Markus Jantti, an economist at a Swedish university, found that 42 percent of American men raised in the bottom fifth of incomes stay there as adults. That shows a level of persistent disadvantage much higher than in Denmark (25 percent) and Britain (30 percent)—a country famous for its class constraints. Meanwhile, just 8 percent of American men at the bottom rose to the top fifth. That compares with 12 percent of the British and 14 percent of the Danes. Despite frequent references to the United States as a classless society, about 62 percent of Americans (male and female) raised in the top fifth of incomes stay in the top two-fifths, according to research by the Economic Mobility Project of the Pew Charitable Trusts. Similarly, 65 percent born in the bottom fifth stay in the bottom two-fifths.

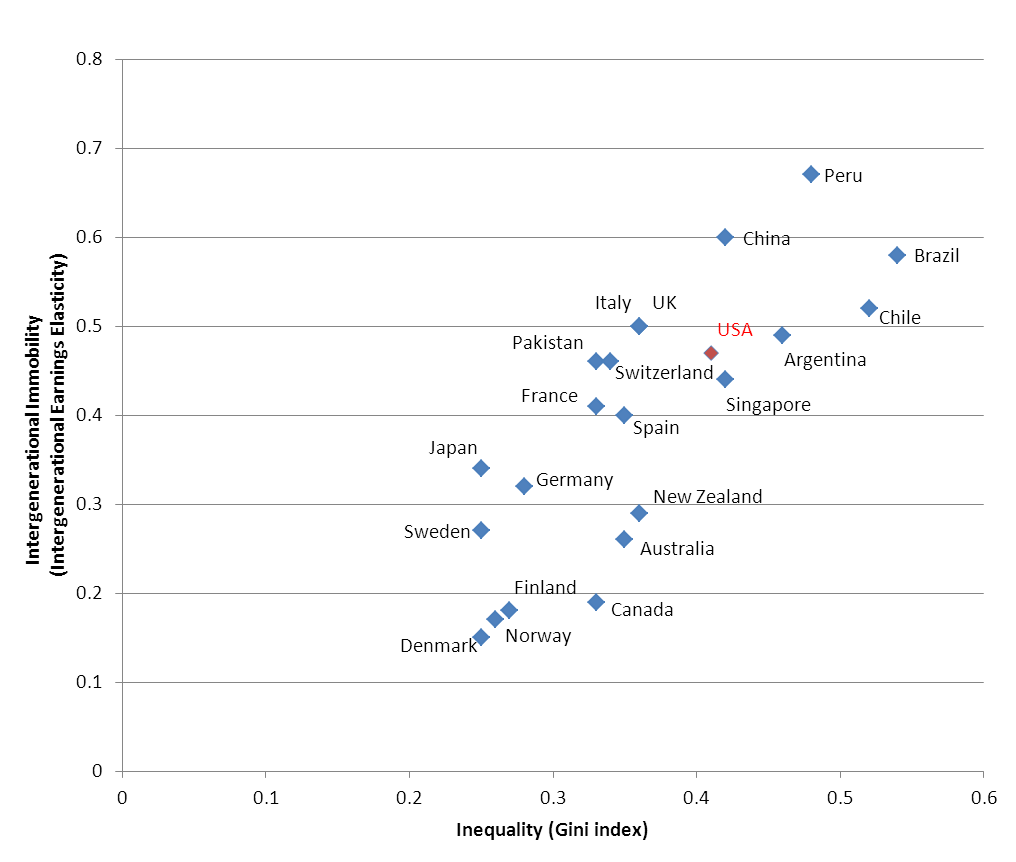
Intergenerational immobility versus economic inequality in 2012. Countries closest to the axis in the left bottom have the highest levels of socio-economic equality and socio-economic mobility.

In 2012, a graph plotting the relationship between income inequality and intergenerational social mobility in the United States and twelve other developed countries—dubbed "The Great Gatsby Curve"—showed "a clear negative relationship" between inequality and social mobility. Countries with low levels of inequality such as Denmark, Norway and Finland had some of the greatest mobility, while the two countries with the high level of inequality—Chile and Brazil—had some of the lowest mobility. The curve was introduced in a speech by chairman of the Council of Economic Advisers Alan Krueger, and the President's Economic Report to Congress.

Philip Alston, the United Nations special rapporteur on extreme poverty and human rights, asserted in a 2017 report on an investigation of extreme poverty in the United States that "The American Dream is rapidly becoming the American Illusion since the US now has the lowest rate of social mobility of any of the rich countries."

=== Absolute mobility ===
Even though mobility has gone down, most Americans still have more income than their parents. A 2007 study "Economic Mobility Project: Across Generations", using Panel Study of Income Dynamics, found 67% of Americans who were children in 1968 had higher levels of real family income in 1995–2002 than their parents had in 1967–1971 (although most of this growth in total family income can be attributed to the increasing number of women who work since male earnings have stayed relatively stable throughout this time). This proportion, however, has fallen from an approximate 90% of Americans born in 1940s.

According to research done by the Institute of Labor Economics based in Germany, this decline in absolute mobility has not been universally experienced among other countries. (Note: Research was done on children from Canada, Denmark, Finland, the Netherlands, Norway, Sweden, the United Kingdom, and the United States.) In an observation of absolute mobility experienced by children born in the late 19th century, America saw an unusually higher decline in mobility than was faced by others researched. Finland, Norway, and Sweden all steadily outperformed the United States in this time interval. However, Denmark, the Netherlands, and the U.K. had greater overall economic mobility but a sharp decline below the U.S past the 1980s, which researchers attributed to the Great Recession.

== Intragenerational mobility ==
Another form of mobility—"intra-generational"—is the change in class and/or income experienced by individuals during their lifetime. Intra-generational mobility renders the meaning of "short-term" inequality ambiguous, since high intra-generational mobility suggests that those who are currently less well-off (for instance the young) will move up the class or income scale later in life.

How strong Intra-generational mobility is in the US is disputed. Supporting relatively high levels of intragenerational mobility, Thomas A. Garrett reported on a US Treasury study of income mobility from 1996 to 2005. This found "There was considerable income mobility of individuals in the U.S. economy during the 1996 through 2005 period as over half of taxpayers moved to a different income quintile over this period"; 80 percent of taxpayers had incomes in quintiles as high or higher in 2005 than they did in 1996, and 45 percent of taxpayers not in the highest income quintile moved up at least one quintile. Fewer than half (between 40 and 43%) "of those in the top 1 percent in 1996 were still in the top 1 percent in 2005. Only about 25 percent of the individuals in the top 1/100th percent in 1996 remained in the top 1/100th percent in 2005." The study reassured Americans "the opportunity for upward mobility" in America despite their concern about the "long-term trend of increasing income inequality in the U.S. economy" After-tax income of the top 1% earners has grown by 176% percent from 1979 to 2007 while it grew only 9% for the lowest 20%.

However others describe the data as reflecting less mobility. A 2007 inequality and mobility study by Wojciech Kopczuk and Emmanuel Saez found the pattern of annual and long-term earnings inequality "very close", and the population at top income levels in America "very stable" and had "not mitigated the dramatic increase in annual earnings concentration since the 1970s." A 2011 CBO study on "Trends in the Distribution of Household Income Between 1979 and 2007" also found multi-year household income distribution in America "only modestly" more equal than annual income.

Given the fairly substantial movement of households across income groups over time, it might seem that income measured over a number of years should be significantly more equally distributed than income measured over one year. However, much of the movement of households involves changes in income that are large enough to push households into different income groups but not large enough to greatly affect the overall distribution of income. Multi-year income measures also show the same pattern of increasing inequality over time as is observed in annual measures.

In other words, "many people who have incomes greater than $1 million one year fall out of the category the next year—but that’s typically because their income fell from, say, 1.05 million to 0.95 million, not because they went back to being middle class."

Economist Paul Krugman complains that conservatives have resorted to "extraordinary series of attempts at statistical distortion" in claiming high levels of mobility.

Studies by the Urban Institute and the US Treasury have both found that about half of the families who start in either the top or the bottom quintile of the income distribution are still there after a decade, and that only 3 to 6 percent rise from bottom to top or fall from top to bottom.

While in any given year, some of the people with low incomes will be "workers on temporary layoff, small businessmen taking writeoffs, farmers hit by bad weather"—the rise in their income in succeeding years is not the same 'mobility' as poor people rising to middle class or middle income rising to wealth. It's the mobility of "the guy who works in the college bookstore and has a real job by his early thirties."

== Causes and issues ==
Explanations for the relatively low level of social mobility in the US include the better access of affluent children to superior schools and preparation for schools so important in an economy where pay is tilted toward educated workers; high levels of immigration of unskilled laborers and low rate of unionization, which leads to lower wages among the least skilled; public health problems, like obesity and diabetes, which can limit education and employment; the sheer size of the income gap between the rich which makes it harder to climb the proverbial income ladder when the rungs are farther apart; poverty, since those with low income have significantly lower rates of mobility than middle and higher income individuals. The factors which affect social mobility vary across the United States as does social mobility which in favored areas is much higher than in less favored areas.

A 2022 study suggested that factors that contribute to low levels of intergenerational mobility in the United States include a disparity in returns to human capital, low levels of public investment in the human capital of low-income children, high levels of socioeconomic residential segregation, and low levels of progressiveness in the tax-and-transfer system.

=== Education ===
Ivy-Plus admissions rates vary with the income of the students' parents, with the acceptance rate of the top 0.1% income percentile being almost twice as much as other students.

Multiple reports have found that education promotes economic mobility. The report “Pursuing the American Dream: Economic Mobility Across Generations” found that a four-year college degree promotes upward mobility from the bottom and prevents downward mobility from the middle and top. For instance, having a four-year college degree makes someone born into the bottom quintile of income three times more likely to climb all the way to the top as an adult.

Wages and earnings correlate with education. A 2009 survey of young adults who worked full-time (Note: (35 or more hours per week)) throughout a full year (Note: (50 or more weeks of employment)) found the median income of whose without a high school diploma ($21,000) was below the poverty level for a family of four ($22,050) and less than half of what whose with a bachelor's degree earned ($45,000).

Education and Income (2017)
Educational Attainment	Young Adult Median Income
Master's degree or higher	$65,000
Bachelor's degree	$51,800
High School Diploma (or equivalent)	$32,000
No High School Diploma (or equivalent)	$26,000

The difference has worsened since 1979 when the average college graduate made 38% more than the average high school graduate. By 2011 college graduates averaged 75% higher incomes. "Mobility" to the "class" of college graduates has declined. Those born with parents who graduated from college have far better odds of graduating from college than those born to high school graduates.

Some scholars (such as Isabel Sawhill) have complained about the effect of education on mobility

“At virtually every level, education in America tends to perpetuate rather than compensate for existing inequalities. The reasons are threefold. First, the K through 12 education system is simply not very strong and thus is not an effective way to break the link between parental background and a child’s eventual success. ... Second, because K–12 education is financed largely at the state and local level, resources devoted to education are closely linked with where people live and with the property wealth of their neighbors. For this and other reasons, poor children tend to go to poor schools and more advantaged children to good schools. ... Finally, access both to a quality preschool experience and to higher education continues to depend quite directly on family resources.”

Others (Robert M. Hauser) have defended educational attainment as also freeing "individuals from the constraints of their social origins."

=== Poverty ===
Social connectedness to people of higher income levels is a strong predictor of upward income mobility. However, data shows substantial social segregation correlating with economic income groups.

Comparing the US with one high-mobility state (Denmark), journalist Kevin Drum concluded that lack of mobility for the poorest children in the United States seems to be the primary reason for America's lag behind other developed countries. A study from the Economic Mobility Project found that growing up in a high-poverty neighborhood increases Americans’ risk of experiencing downward mobility and explains a sizable portion of the black-white downward mobility gap. The report's analysis also showed that black children who experience a reduction in their neighborhood's poverty rate have greater economic success in adulthood than black children who experience poverty rates that increase or are stable.

=== Gender and race ===
Reports analyzing the economic mobility of African-Americans compared to that of whites have found stark differences. One report found that 53 percent of blacks born in the bottom income quintile remain there as adults, while only 33 percent of whites do. Research has also found that the children of black middle-class families are more likely to fall out of the middle class.

Despite the increased presence of blacks and women in the work force over the years, women and non-whites hold jobs with less rank, authority, opportunity for advancement and pay than men and whites, a "glass ceiling" being said to prevent them from occupying more than a very small percentage in top managerial positions.

One explanation for this is seen in the networks of genders and ethnic groups. The more managers there are in an employee’s immediate work environment, the higher that employee’s chances of interacting and spending time with high status/income colleagues, the more likely these employees are to be drawn on for promotion. As of the 1990s, the vast majority of all clerical and office workers are women, but made up less than half of all managers. Less than 15% of all managers were minorities, while roughly a quarter of all clerical and office employees were. The networks of women and minorities are simply not as strong as those of males and whites, putting them at a disadvantage in status/income mobility.

For women, another explanation for this "glass ceiling" effect in the American work force is the job-family trade off. While both men and women feel that a conflict exists between job and family, women with children, particularly married women, are more likely to either temporarily leave the labor force or cut back on employment by using flex time, working part-time or part of the year. Unfortunately, the outcome is lower mobility, since part-time employment is usually lower paying employment, with less chance of promotion into a higher status job or likelihood of a return to full-time employment for at least a few years.

Taking a leave from the work force tends to decrease human capital when it comes to finding a job. Women are also more likely than men to take leave from their jobs to care for others rather than themselves. Knowing this, employers are wary of hiring and promoting women in the work force.

Others have pointed out that men have statistically been willing to accept job conditions that women were not, such as working outside in extreme weather, working where you can become physically dirty on a regular basis, working more hours, etc. This is based on survey information, and shows that it is difficult to make direct comparisons ('apples to apples'). Conservatives also question the extent of gender discrimination arguing that competition between firms would lead them to bid up wages of any group if they provided the same or better value of work for less pay as employees.

=== Immigration ===
According to economist George J. Borjas, most immigrants to the US are at "a sizable earning disadvantage" compared to native-born workers, and the earnings of different groups of immigrants vary widely. Borjas found that intergenerational upward economic mobility averaged between a 5% to 10% increase in income from the first to the second generation of immigrants, although there was wide variation among ethnic groups. Other research suggests that length of time resided in the U.S. narrows the occupational gap between Hispanic immigrants and non-Hispanic whites and U.S.-born Hispanic counterparts. Overcoming language barriers and adjusting to the new environment and culture to American society creates barriers for new immigrants, and "there is significant economic 'catching up' between the first and second generations" (second generation being defined as child with at least one parent not born in the United States). This intergenerational mobility includes poor as well as middle income groups, although among the high income Borjas noted a regression towards the mean or equalizing tendency in income/status, whereby children of very successful immigrants tended to have lower, not higher, incomes/status than their parents, becoming successful but not as successful.

In particular, children coming from low-income immigrant families struggle with the disadvantages of their legal status more than the average American due to the level of stress they are exposed to, most specifically through the manner in which they are perceived as well as the way in which they see themselves and their future. Scholars that have studied the social characteristics that arise from having an immigrant status have defined this state of struggle as the "master status" that anchors their decisions in every aspect of their lives, often serving as a crippling agent in their individual developments. When looking specifically into the Latino population, there is an immense hesitance in pursuing education post-high school. According to a study conducted by Abrego in 2006, Latino immigrants without a legal status were more reluctant in pursuing higher education levels, including college as compared to their legal brethren. Most immigrants suffer silently in this manner due to a lack of a healthy immigrant niche construction through which they are able to assimilate accordingly and take advantage of the educational and social opportunities. In Norway for example, the government was able to facilitate increasing levels of re-distributive policies that allowed for a functional welfare state in which the immigrant population were able to lower the gaps of social class differences and becoming increasingly affluent in their ambitions of maintaining better lifestyles. Hence, social mobility is the deferred offspring of many welfare states including the United States due to their low public spending incentives. Studies conducted on education spending in the United States have shown that as compared to the private funding of education, only 2.7% of the nation's total GDP is spent towards public education.

Shifting the perspective to the effects immigration has placed on the existing economic status of the African-American population, there is yet even higher levels of economic bifurcations. While African-Americans occupied larger employment levels of at least 19 percent in sectors like transportation and hospital and social services during the 1990s, immigration caused a shift in this employment trend pushing them more towards private or self employment. One causing factor is the growing Puerto Rican and Mexican population who have increasingly found their employment niches in these specific sectors. Another pattern seen in the economic regression of African-Americans is the invisible role of education in expanding their career opportunities. Historical data shows that the African-American's future advances were highly discounted by scholars like Orley Ashenfelter (1977) and William A. Darity (1982). Consensus studies conducted in the earlier periods of 1940 through 1960 also led many people to argue that black economic mobility through the route of education was closed. Comparatively, the 1990 Census as conducted by the National Center for Health Statistics showed that African-Americans made 63 percent less than the average American due to poor health conditions driven by their unequal social status. Displacement is seen even in low wage sector jobs, including janitorial positions that have become increasingly taken over by Mexicans and while African-Americans have still held these positions in the government, their economic position is considerably diminishing in this area. Hence, the economic stability of African-Americans are not only challenged through their social state but by the growing migration patterns as well.

=== Impact of incarceration ===
According to some researchers, America's high incarceration (imprisonment) rate, and "war on drugs" policies, have created an underclass with severely limited social mobility. Within the United States the prison population has been steadily increasing since the early 1970s and has now surpassed two million, making it the highest per capita rate in the world. This boom has been fueled to a large extent by the war on drugs starting in the 1980s. In addition to the mobility handicaps of imprisonment, this "war" has effectively created a poor, immobile class by denying one of the most important tools for social mobility—education—in a number of ways

1. The drug war has combined with public school zero-tolerance policies to remove tens of thousands of adolescents from their public schools.
2. Denial of higher education funding has been adopted as an additional punishment for drug offenders.
3. The war on drugs siphons drug users out of society and into prison.

The lack of education for convicted felons is compounded with difficulties in finding employment. These two factors contribute towards a high recidivism rate and downward social mobility.

=== Tax expenditures ===
Tax expenditures, partial exemption of the poor from taxation through reliance on progressive income taxes rather than sales taxes for revenue or tax rebates such as the earned income tax credit loosely correlate with income mobility with areas which tax the poor heavily such as the Deep South showing low mobility. The literature that supports this claim acknowledges that nontrivial confounds are inherent to this line of inquiry, however.

=== Other factors ===
Significant correlations have been found between intergenerational mobility and economic inequality, economic and racial residential segregation, measures of K-12 school quality (such as test scores and high school dropout rates), social capital indices, and measures of family structure (such as the fraction of single parents in an area)

== History of study ==
Sociologists Blau and Duncan collected mobility data along with the U.S. Bureau of the Census in 1962. The data included information on occupational family backgrounds. In 1962, 56.8% of sons with fathers who had occupations in upper nonmanual ended up with occupations in the same level. Only 1.2% of sons with fathers who had farming occupations ended up in upper nonmanual occupations. In 1973, these differences increased. 59.4% of sons with fathers in upper nonmanual occupations achieved occupations of this same level and 0.9% of sons with fathers in farming occupations ended up in upper nonmanual occupations. However, the occupational structure is more rigid towards the top and bottom. Those in lower nonmanual occupations, and upper and lower manual occupations were more likely to be vertically mobile. Upper nonmanual occupations have the highest level of occupational inheritance. In the 1980s studies found that only 20 percent of the income gap persisted between generations in America, according to the Christian Science Monitor. However, by 2003 improvements in econometrics showed that poverty could endure over several generations.

== See also ==
- Culture
- Cycle of poverty
- Occupational burnout
- Racial inequality in the United States
- Income inequality in the United States
- Higher education bubble in the United States
- First-generation college students in the United States
- Criticism of credit scoring systems in the United States
