= Epidemiology of diabetes =

Globally, an estimated 537 million adults are living with diabetes, according to 2021 data from the International Diabetes Federation. Diabetes was the 9th-leading cause of mortality globally in 2020, attributing to over 2 million deaths annually due to diabetes directly, and to kidney disease due to diabetes. The primary causes of type 2 diabetes is diet and physical activity, which can contribute to increased BMI, poor nutrition, hypertension, alcohol use and smoking, while genetics is also a factor. Diabetes prevalence is increasing rapidly; previous 2019 estimates put the number at 463 million people living with diabetes, with the distributions being equal between both sexes incidence peaking around age 55 years old. The number is projected to 643 million by 2030, or 7079 individuals per 100,000, with all regions around the world continue to rise. Type 2 diabetes makes up about 85-90% of all cases. Increases in the overall diabetes prevalence rates largely reflect an increase in risk factors for type 2, notably greater longevity and being overweight or obese. The prevalence of African Americans with diabetes is estimated to triple by 2050, while the prevalence of white Americans is estimated to double. The overall prevalence increases with age, with the largest increase in people over 65 years of age. The prevalence of diabetes in America is estimated to increase to 48.3 million by 2050.

Diabetes mellitus occurs throughout the world, but is more common (especially type 2) in the more developed countries. The greatest increase in prevalence is, however, occurring in low- and middle-income countries including in Asia and Africa, where most patients will probably be found by 2030. The increase in incidence in developing countries follows the trend of urbanization and lifestyle changes, including increasingly sedentary lifestyles, less physically demanding work and the global nutrition transition, marked by increased intake of foods that are high energy-dense but nutrient-poor (often high in sugar and saturated fats, sometimes referred to as the Western pattern diet). The risk of getting type 2 diabetes has been widely found to be associated with lower socio-economic position across countries.

The WHO estimates that diabetes resulted in 1.5 million deaths in 2012, making it the 8th leading cause of death. However another 2.2 million deaths worldwide were attributable to high blood glucose and the increased risks of associated complications (e.g. heart disease, stroke, kidney failure), which often result in premature death and are often listed as the underlying cause on death certificates rather than diabetes. The burden of diabetes (both type 1 and 2) has a possibility to lead to complications of multiple body systems including nephropathy, neuropathy and retinopathy. About half of patients with type 2 diabetes die due to cardiovascular disease and 10% from kidney failure. A study done on Gomel city population with radiation exposure after the Chernobyl incident demonstrated increased incidence of type 1 diabetes mellitus. Women who had gestational diabetes during pregnancy have a 20-50% increased risk of developing type 2 diabetes later in life.

Share of people with diabetes Map

Death rate from diabetes Map

Death rate from diabetes Line

== Asia ==
=== China ===
Almost one Chinese adult in four has diabetes. The International Diabetes Federation estimated in 2021 more than 140 million Chinese adults with diabetes. The incidence of the disease is increasing rapidly: a reported 30% increase in 7 years. Indigenous nomadic peoples like Tibetans and Mongols are at much higher susceptibility than Han Chinese.

=== India ===
India has the second highest number of people with diabetes. Diabetes currently affects more than 74 million Indians, which is more than 8.3% of the adult population. It is estimated to be around 57% of the current cases of diabetes to be undiagnosed.

Among young and middle aged adults the prevalence of diabetes is 6.7% and prediabetes is 5.6% according to the National Family Health Survey-4. The average age on onset is 42.5 years. Nearly 1 million Indians die due to diabetes every year.

According to the Indian Heart Association, India is projected to be home to 109 million individuals with diabetes by 2035. A study by the American Diabetes Association reports that India will see the greatest increase in people diagnosed with diabetes by 2030. The high incidence is attributed to a combination of genetic susceptibility plus adoption of a high-calorie, low-activity lifestyle by India's growing middle class.

=== Japan ===
Diabetes is a growing public disease and challenge in Japan. According to recent evaluations, about 11 million people in Japan have diabetes. It has been rising over the years, with medical costs involving diabetes reaching 1.21 trillion yen or 2.8% of Japan's total medical costs. The reason for the increase in diabetes in Japan could be due to eating habits, genetics, or lifestyle risks.

== Europe ==
=== United Kingdom ===
In 2021 there were 4.1 million people in the UK diagnosed with diabetes, 90% of them having type 2. There were a further 1 million people with undiagnosed type 2 diabetes and 13.6 million people were at risk of developing type 2 diabetes, half of which could be prevented. The charity Diabetes UK have made predictions that could become high as 6.2 million by 2035–2036. The National Health Service (NHS) spent a daily average of £2.2m (€2.6m; $3.7m) in 2013 on prescriptions for managing diabetes in primary care, and about 10% of the primary care prescribing budget is spent on treating diabetes. Diabetes UK have also predicted that the NHS could be spending as much as 16.9 billion pounds on diabetes mellitus by 2035, a figure that means the NHS could be spending as much as 17% of its budget on diabetes treatment by 2035.

== North America ==
=== Canada ===
Almost 2.4 million Canadians (6.8%) have been diagnosed with type 1 or type 2 diabetes, based on 2009 chronic disease surveillance data. Prevalence is higher among males (7.2%) than females (6.4%). However these numbers are likely an underestimate, as data obtained from blood samples indicate about 20% of diabetes cases remain undiagnosed.

The prevalence of diagnosed diabetes among Canadians increased by 70% over the decade from 1999 to 2009. The greatest relative increase in prevalence was seen younger adults (35 to 44 years), attributable in part to increasing rates of overweight and obesity. The Public Health Agency of Canada estimates that if current trends in diabetes continue, the number of Canadians living with diabetes will reach 3.7 million by 2019.

=== United States ===
Diabetes rates at county levels 2004–2009

Diabetes rates in the United States, 1994–2010

Diabetes rates in the United States, like across North America and around the world, have been increasing substantially. The diagnosis of diabetes has quadrupled in the last 30 years in America, increasing from 5.5 million in 1980 to 21.1 million in 2010. From 1988 to 1994, about 25% of American adults, aged 40–74 years old, were classified as having prediabetes. According to the 2014 Statistics Report done by the CDC it was found that, "Diabetes Mellitus affects an estimated 29.1 million people in the United States and is the 7th leading cause of death. It also increases the chances of mortality, as well as the risk for heart attack, kidney failure, and blindness" While the number of people with diabetes in the US continues to grow, the number of new cases has been declining since 2009, after decades of increases in new cases. In 2014, more than 29 million people had diabetes in the United States, of whom 7 million people remain undiagnosed. As of 2012 another 57 million people were estimated to have prediabetes. There were approximately 12.1 million diabetes-related emergency department (ED) visits in 2010 for adults aged 18 years or older (515 per 10,000 U.S. population), accounting for 9.4 percent of all ED visits.

The Centers for Disease Control and Prevention (CDC) has called the change an epidemic. Geographically, there is a U.S. diabetes belt with high diabetes prevalence estimates, which includes Mississippi and parts of Alabama, Arkansas, Florida, Georgia, Kentucky, Louisiana, North Carolina, Ohio, Pennsylvania, South Carolina, Tennessee, Texas, Virginia, and West Virginia. The National Diabetes Information Clearinghouse estimates diabetes costs $132 billion in the United States alone every year. About 5%–10% of diabetes cases in North America are type 1, with the rest being type 2. The fraction of type 1 in other parts of the world differs. Most of this difference is not currently understood. The American Diabetes Association (ADA) cites the 2003 assessment of the National Center for Chronic Disease Prevention and Health Promotion (Centers for Disease Control and Prevention) that one in three Americans born after 2000 will develop diabetes in their lifetimes.

Diabetes is also more prominent in minority groups. For example, according to the American Diabetes Association the rates of diagnosed diabetes are 12.8% of Hispanics, 13.2% of Non-Hispanic blacks, 15.9% of American Indians/Alaskan Natives. White Non-Hispanic whites are 7.6% and only 9% of Asian Americans have diagnosed diabetes. 4.9% of American adults had diabetes in 1990. By 1998, that number rose by a third to 6.5%. The prevalence of diabetes increased for both sexes and every racial group. American women have suffered from diabetes at a higher rate than men, with 7.4% of women being diabetic in 1998, as opposed to only 5.5% of men. The increase in diabetes coincides with an increase in average weight across both genders. In the same time frame, average weight in both men and women increased by nearly 4 kilograms. This relates to the fact that the most common form of diabetes, type 2, is strongly associated with unhealthy weight. Older Americans have suffered from diabetes at a much higher rate than younger people, with over 12% of those in their 60s and 70s being diabetic in 1998. In the same year, less than 2% of those under 30 suffered from diabetes. Weight is also a strong factor in one's likelihood of becoming diabetic, with 13.5% of obese Americans in 1998 being diabetic. In the same year, only 3.5% of people at a healthy weight had the disease.

As of 2006, about 18.3% (8.6 million) of Americans age 60 and older had diabetes, according to the ADA. Diabetes mellitus prevalence increases with age, and the numbers of older persons with diabetes are expected to grow as the elderly population increases in number. The National Health and Nutrition Examination Survey (NHANES III) from 1988 to 1994 demonstrated, in the population over 65 years old, 18% to 20% had diabetes, with 40% having either diabetes or its precursor form of impaired glucose tolerance. Older individuals are also more likely to be seen in the emergency department (ED) for diabetes. A study by the Agency for Healthcare Research and Quality (AHRQ) found that in 2010, diabetes-related ED visit rates were highest for patients aged 65 and older (1,307 per 10,000 population), compared with 45- to 64-year-olds (584 per 10,000 population) and 18- to 44-year-olds (183 per 10,000 population).

A second study by AHRQ found that diabetes with complications was one of the twenty most expensive conditions seen in U.S. inpatient hospitalizations in 2011, with an aggregate cost of nearly $5.4 billion for 561,000 stays. It was among the top five most expensive conditions for uninsured patients, at an aggregate cost of $440 million for 62,000 hospitalizations.

== South America ==
=== Brazil ===
In Brazil, adults from ages 20 to 79 affected with diabetes (type I and II) totaled 16,621,400, which is estimated to be 10.6% of their population (2024). Looking at how type I and II diabetes could behave in the future, it is projected that 24 million, or 12.3% of the population, will be affected by 2050. In 2024, it is predicted that if the diabetes rates in Brazil continue to rise as they did from 2006 to 2020, then by 2036, about 27% of adults could have type II diabetes.

== Oceania and the Pacific ==
=== Australia ===
An estimated 1.5 million Australians have diabetes. Indigenous populations in developed countries generally have higher prevalence and incidence of diabetes than their corresponding nonindigenous populations. In Australia, the age-standardised prevalence of self-reported diabetes in indigenous Australians is almost four times that of nonindigenous Australians. Reasons include higher rates of obesity, physical inactivity, and living in poor housing and environments among Indigenous peoples. Preventative community health programs are showing some success in tackling this problem.

== Africa ==
In Africa, the cases of diabetes have risen significantly from 1990 to 2022. It is estimated that in 1990, there were 12 million cases of diagnosed diabetes in Africa; there was then a jump to approximately 54 million cases in 2022. When left untreated, diabetes can cause premature death. Untreated and undiagnosed diabetes is higher in middle and lower-income countries, such as Africa. In Africa, the rate of death from pre-mature diabetes is at 58%; in comparison, the global rate is at 48.1%. Overall, there has been more research done on the epidemiology of type II diabetes in African countries than there has been on type I diabetes. Type II diabetes rates are rising worldwide due to increasing obesity and a lack of physical exercise. This is no different in Africa, as there is an increase in the rates of type II diabetes. In looking at why the rates of diabetes are increasing in Africa, it seems that there is a mix of environmental and genetic factors.

== Research Knowledge Gaps ==
Although diabetes data in the world is lacking, it can be seen that in rural parts of the continent, the prevalence of diabetes is not as great as in urban parts of the continent. This suggests that environmental factors do play a role in the rise of diabetes. More diabetes research is still needed overall before putting focus on specific continents and countries.

== See also ==
- Epidemiology of obesity
- Epidemiology of childhood obesity
- Diabetes in the USA
