= Sansum Clinic =

Healthcare non-profit in Santa Barbara, California

Coordinates: 34.4291°N 119.7225°W

- Type: Non-profit organization
- Industry: Health care
- Founded: Santa Barbara, California, United States (1921)
- Founder: William Sansum
- Headquarters: Santa Barbara, California, United States
- Area served: North America
- Website: sansumclinic.org

Sansum Clinic, founded in 1921, is one of the oldest non-profit clinics in California. Located in Santa Barbara, it is also one of the largest healthcare providers on the south and central coast of California. The Sansum Clinic was established by Dr. William David Sansum, the first physician to develop and administer insulin in the U.S. to successfully treat a diabetic patient. The clinic expanded to treat other patients who did not require hospitalization. As of October 2023, Sansum Clinic's approximately 1,450 physicians and staff represent more than 30 medical specialties and subspecialties at 22 patient care locations.

== History ==
Two of the oldest clinics in the area, Sansum Medical Clinic and Santa Barbara Medical Clinic, merged in 1998 as the Sansum-Santa Barbara Medical Foundation Clinic; in 2006, it was renamed Sansum Clinic. The Cancer Center of Santa Barbara joined Sansum Clinic as the Cancer Center of Santa Barbara with Sansum Clinic in 2012. In 2017, the Cancer Center opened a new facility and was renamed the Ridley-Tree Cancer Center, in honor of lead donor Lady Leslie Ridley-Tree. In 2023, Sansum Clinic joined the Sacramento-based Sutter Health, to bring the benefits of that larger integrated healthcare system to the Central Coast.

=== Sansum Medical Clinic ===
In 1920, William D. Sansum (1880–1948) arrived in Santa Barbara, California to serve as head of the Potter Metabolic Clinic. This clinic was founded in 1916 in a New York City Hospital to serve patients with diabetes, nephritis and gout. The Potter Clinic was largely funded by the Carnegie Corporation of New York, and in 1919 was moved to Santa Barbara.

Dr. Sansum specialized in diabetes, a fatal disease at the time. It was the subject of his doctoral thesis, and the related theme in nearly twenty scholarly papers he wrote in eight years. In May 1922, Dr. Sansum became the first physician to develop and administer insulin in the U.S. to successfully treat a diabetic patient. He also developed methods to obtain a higher yield of insulin from raw material.

Dr. Sansum established the Sansum Medical Clinic in 1928 to treat health problems of patients (who did not require hospitalization) with the latest research and medical advances at the time. The Sansum Medical Clinic focused on clinical specialization, assessment and treatment and research. The clinic attracted out-of-town and out-of-state patients, especially those with diabetes, in need of specialized medical services.

Dr. Sanusm's 1925 short book The Normal Diet: A Simple Statement of the Fundamental Principles of Diet for the Mutual Use of Physicians and Patients went through three editions. An extensively revised and enlarged version entitled The Normal Diet and Healthful Living, coauthored with Roger Aminiel Hare and Ruth Bowden, was published in 1936.

=== Santa Barbara Medical Clinic ===
The Santa Barbara Clinic was established in 1921 as one of the earliest multi-specialty group medical practices in the nation.

Dr. Rexwald Brown headed the new clinic. He was influenced by watching the collaborative process of physicians in World War I, observing physicians, each with a different specialty, operating together to diagnose and treat the wounded soldiers efficiently.

He brought the same process to a civilian setting. He felt specialists could remain current in their own field, and work collaboratively with other specialists to provide the best resources and knowledge to help a patient. This new concept gained acceptance and continued to grow; physicians were added every year as the need for different specialists was recognized. This was in contrast to the traditional role of clinics at that time which were defined as hospital-based research-oriented facilities, treating patients with specific ailments.

=== Cancer Center of Santa Barbara ===
The Cancer Center of Santa Barbara was formed in 1950 with the donation of funds to purchase a one-million-volt x-ray machine. In 1949, Lillian Converse was treated for terminal cancer. Though she died, her husband Elisha Converse donated the funds for her doctor, Henry Ullmann, to purchase the x-ray machine in the memory of his wife; it was one of seven in the United States used to treat cancer at the time.

Through the contributions of families and charities, the non-surgical and outpatient center committed itself to advancing the understanding, diagnosis, treatment, cure and prevention of cancer.

In 2012 the Cancer Center of Santa Barbara merged with Sansum Clinic to create the Cancer Center of Santa Barbara with Sansum Clinic.

=== Ridley-Tree Cancer Center ===
In 2017, the Cancer Center of Santa Barbara opened a new facility and was re-named Ridley-Tree Cancer Center. The new name honors Lady Leslie Ridley-Tree, honorary campaign chair, for her leadership and significant gift to the campaign for the new center.

=== Sutter Health ===
In 2023, Sansum Clinic announced that it joined Sutter Health, a not-for-profit integrated health delivery system based in Northern California.

== Current practice ==
Sansum Clinic has more than 250 physicians representing more than 30 specialties. The clinic sees more than 125,000 patients (600,000 patient visits) per year and draws patients from all around the country, primarily serving patients throughout Santa Barbara County and the surrounding counties of Ventura, Los Angeles, Kern and San Luis Obispo.

The non-profit clinic offers health education throughout Santa Barbara and wellness programs and services at a reduced price or free, as well as a day camp for children with chronic asthma at no charge.

=== Locations ===
Sansum Clinic operates patient care facilities in Carpinteria, Santa Barbara, Goleta and Solvang. In addition to the Ridley-Tree Cancer Center, It also operates centers for specific medical specialties, such as the Travel & Tropical Medicine Center, Bariatric Surgery Center, Laser Eye Care Center, Facial Plastic Surgery and Aesthetics, and Breast Imaging Center.

In 2014, Sansum Clinic opened the Foothill Surgery Center, an ambulatory surgery center fully accredited by the Accreditation Association of Ambulatory Health Care, Inc. .

== Innovations ==
Sansum Clinic was the first place in the United States where insulin was developed and successfully administered to treat diabetes.

Sansum Clinic was among the earliest multi-specialty group practices established in the nation.

Erno Daniel was among the first physicians in the United States to be certified in the medical specialty of geriatric medicine.

Internist Paul Linaweaver came in with a specialization in undersea medicine and was Director of the West Coast Center for the National Diving Accident Network (now Divers Alert Network).

Dr. Casimir Domz, performed the first successful bone marrow transplant in a patient with an immune deficiency.

The studies on diet and nutrition by Alfred Koehler, focused on the role fat and cholesterol play in degenerative diseases and were years ahead of their time in showing a relationship between cholesterol and arteriosclerosis.

Drs. Francis and Marianna Masin were pioneers in the field of cytology, studying cells in relation to various cancers.

== Controversies ==
In early September 2025, a series of provocative images posted to TikTok by a former employee triggered widespread outrage. The slideshow-style content depicted multiple healthcare workers at the Sansum Clinic (specifically the Pesetas Urgent Care location in Santa Barbara) posing with exam table paper stained by bodily fluids, accompanied by captions referring to them as “sweet gifts.” The staff were shown making mocking gestures and facial expressions, apparently ridiculing patients. After the post went viral over Labor Day weekend, it was deleted and the account was made private; however, screenshots and reposts rapidly circulated. Sutter Health - which oversees the facility - released a statement denouncing the behavior. On September 3, the clinic announced that the employees involved were all terminated as of that date.

== See also ==
- Lois Jovanovič
