= Health in Nauru =

Overview of health statistics and healthcare availability

In Nauru, health is challenged by obesity, limited lifespan and childhood health.

== Demographics ==
In 2013, the 366 live births were divided into 193 males and 173 females. The average age of mothers at first birth in 2007 was 22.1 years. The fertility rate, (numbers of births per 1,000 women aged 15–49) is 105. In 2011, 75 people died.

Cardiovascular disease (44%) and cancer (10%) were the primary causes of deaths in 2002. From 2007 to 2011 the birth rate was 27.2, nearly four times the death rate of 7.5. The estimated infant mortality rate was 8.21 deaths per live births in 2014.

The age structure is dominated by the 15–64 rate (65.6%), while the population younger than 15 and older than 64 is relatively small (32.5% and 1.8%, respectively). The median age is 21.5.

The sex ratio of the population is 0.91 males per 1 female.

Prevalence of obesity in the adult population, top countries (2016), Nauru has the highest rate in the world.

Nauru has the highest obesity rate in the world. 97 per cent of men and 93 per cent of women are overweight or obese. In 2011, the average body mass index was around 34.5. Nauru's obesity rates have been attributed to overconsumption of imported ultra-processed food from an economic downturn from the end of phosphate mining in the region, which also led to 80% of Nauru's land being unsuitable for agriculture.

== Healthcare ==
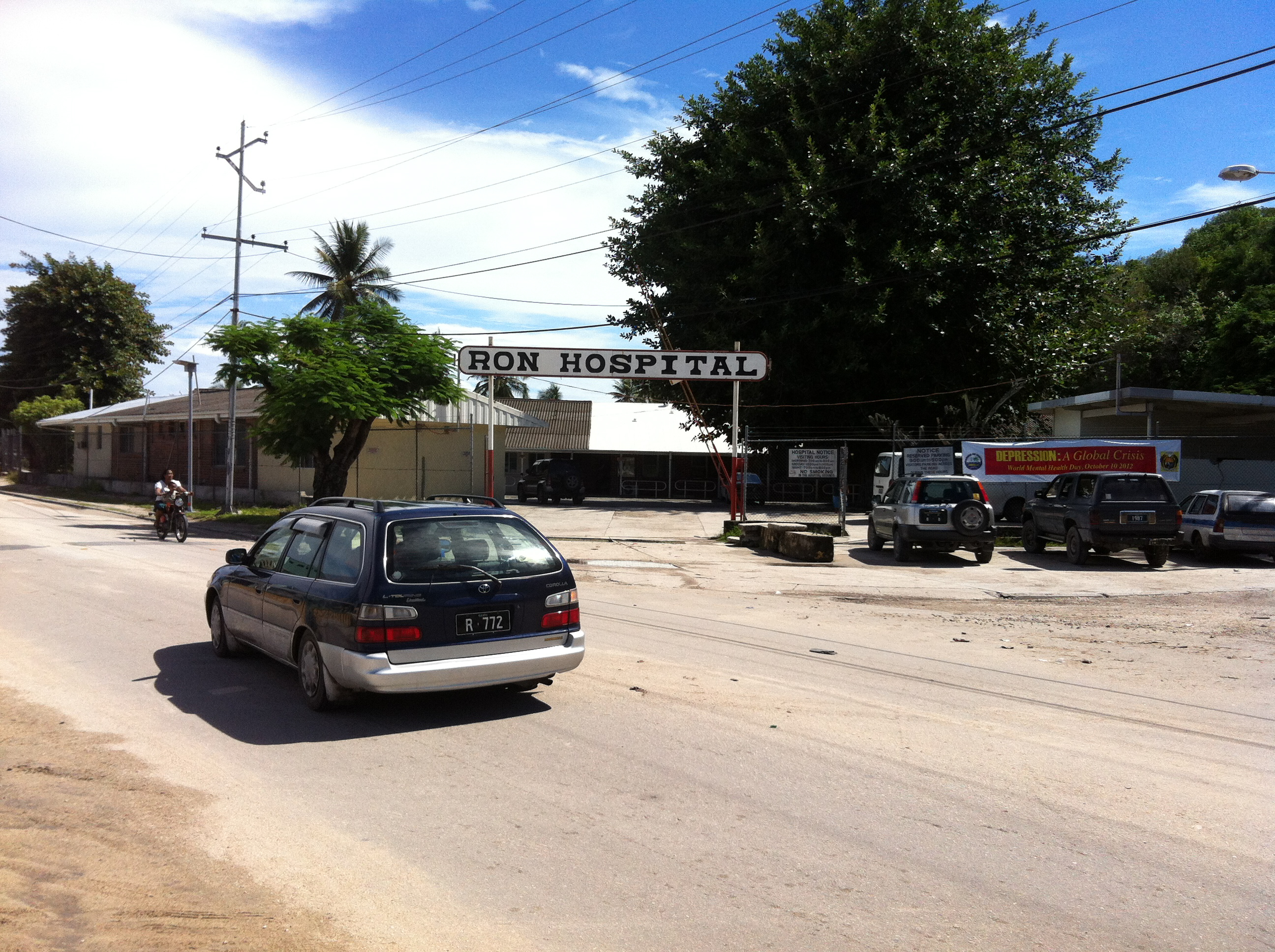
A hospital in Nauru

Nauru has a universal health care system, which is provided to all citizens without charge.

The single hospital is the Republic of Nauru Hospital in Yaren. It was formed by the amalgamation of the government-run Nauru General Hospital and the private Nauru Phosphate Corporation Hospital in 1999. It offers basic medical and surgical care, along with radiological, laboratory, pharmacy and dental services. The Nauru Public Health Centre offers treatments for diabetes and other obesity-related diseases. This is the only form of specialized medical care. Patients who require additional treatment travel to Australia.

In 2012, an estimated 7.5% of its GDP was spent on healthcare. In 2004, 149 physicians and 557 nurses per 100,000 people were present. In 2012, it was estimated that 26.2% and 22.1% of the population under 15 years of age consumed tobacco and cigarettes, respectively. The population has a life expectancy of 66.4 years at birth, which ranks Nauru 169th in the world.

Médecins Sans Frontières provides psychological and psychiatric services for residents, asylum seekers and refugees since late 2017. It was ordered by the government to stop in October 2018 because it was "perceived to be helping refugees". The situation for children on the island was described as "a humanitarian emergency requiring urgent intervention" by the president of the Australian Medical Association.

== See also ==
- Obesity in Nauru
