= Naoero Medical Centre =

Public hospital in Denigomodu, Nauru

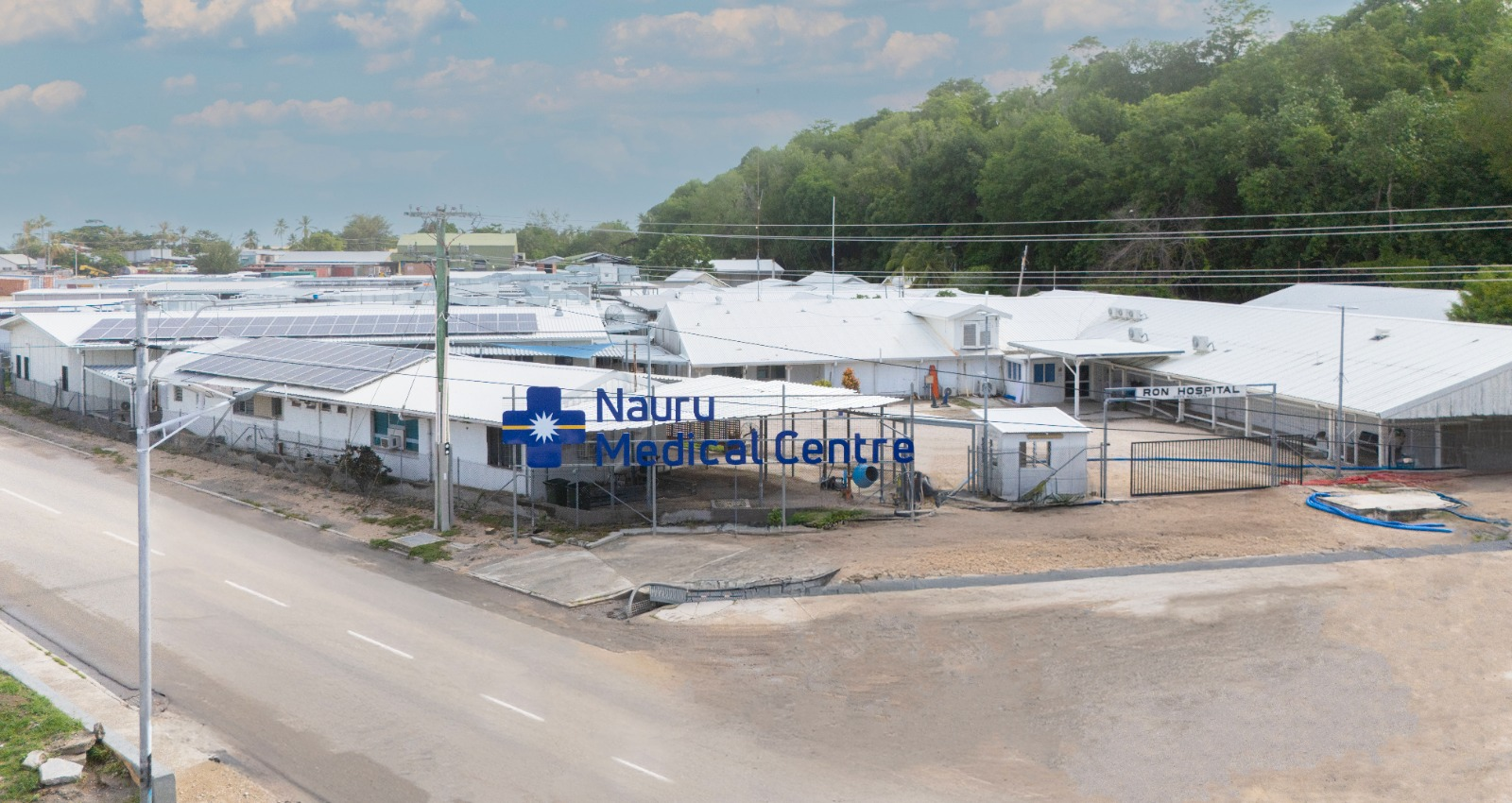

Geography
- Location: Denigomodu, Nauru
- Coordinates: 0°31′27.1″S 166°54′53.2″E

Organisation
- Care system: Public
- Type: District General

Services
- Emergency department: Yes
- Beds: 65

History
- Opened: 1999

Links
- Website: www.nmc.gov.nr
- Lists: Hospitals in Nauru

The Naoero Medical Centre (NMC), formerly the Republic of Nauru Hospital (RON Hospital), is the primary public healthcare facility Nauru, officially the Republic of Naoero, located in Denigomodu District.

== History ==
The facility was established in 1999 under the name Republic of Nauru Hospital (RON Hospital), formed by the amalgamation of the government-run Nauru General Hospital and the private Nauru Phosphate Corporation Hospital. It offered basic medical and surgical care, along with radiology, laboratory, pharmacy and dental services.

In 2025, the Government of Naoero entered into a 10-year management agreement with UAE-based Global Mission Support Services (GMSS) to overhaul healthcare on the island. Following this partnership, the Naoero Medical Centre (NMC) was opened on the premises of RON Hospital.

In September 2026, healthcare development in Nauru was featured in a Washington Times opinion piece, which highlighted the local efforts to reform regional healthcare delivery and model cost-effective practices for larger systems.

== Facilities ==
The NMC is a 65-bed hospital comprising a 10-bed Emergency Department, a 14-bed Acute Care Unit, operating theatres, and wards for paediatrics, maternity, surgery, psychiatry, isolation, and palliative care, among others. Diagnostic infrastructure includes CT imaging, X-ray, ultrasound, echocardiography, and a 24/7 laboratory.

A new dental clinic opened at the NMC on 25 March 2026 as part of a series of facility upgrades.

== Services ==
The NMC provides emergency medicine, general and specialist surgery, paediatrics, obstetrics and gynaecology, dialysis, ophthalmology, mental health, physiotherapy, radiology, laboratory, dental, and pharmacy services. It also coordinates outward medical referrals (OMR) for patients requiring specialist care abroad.

Since 2025, the NMC has performed laparoscopic (minimally invasive) surgery on a routine weekly basis, marking the first time this procedure has been available on the island.

== Workforce ==
The NMC employs more than 350 personnel, including 41 doctors, over 100 nursing staff, and 130 expatriate clinicians, alongside allied health professionals and laboratory scientists. The workforce combines local and international staff, with visiting specialists rotating through the facility on a regular basis.

== See also ==
- Health in Nauru
