= Lois Jovanovic =

American diabetes researcher

- Born: Lois Gretchen Blaustone; May 2, 1947
- Died: September 18, 2018 (aged 71)
- Known for: renowned around the world for her extraordinary contributions to medical science, specifically for pioneering the protocols that make it possible for women with diabetes to deliver healthy babies.

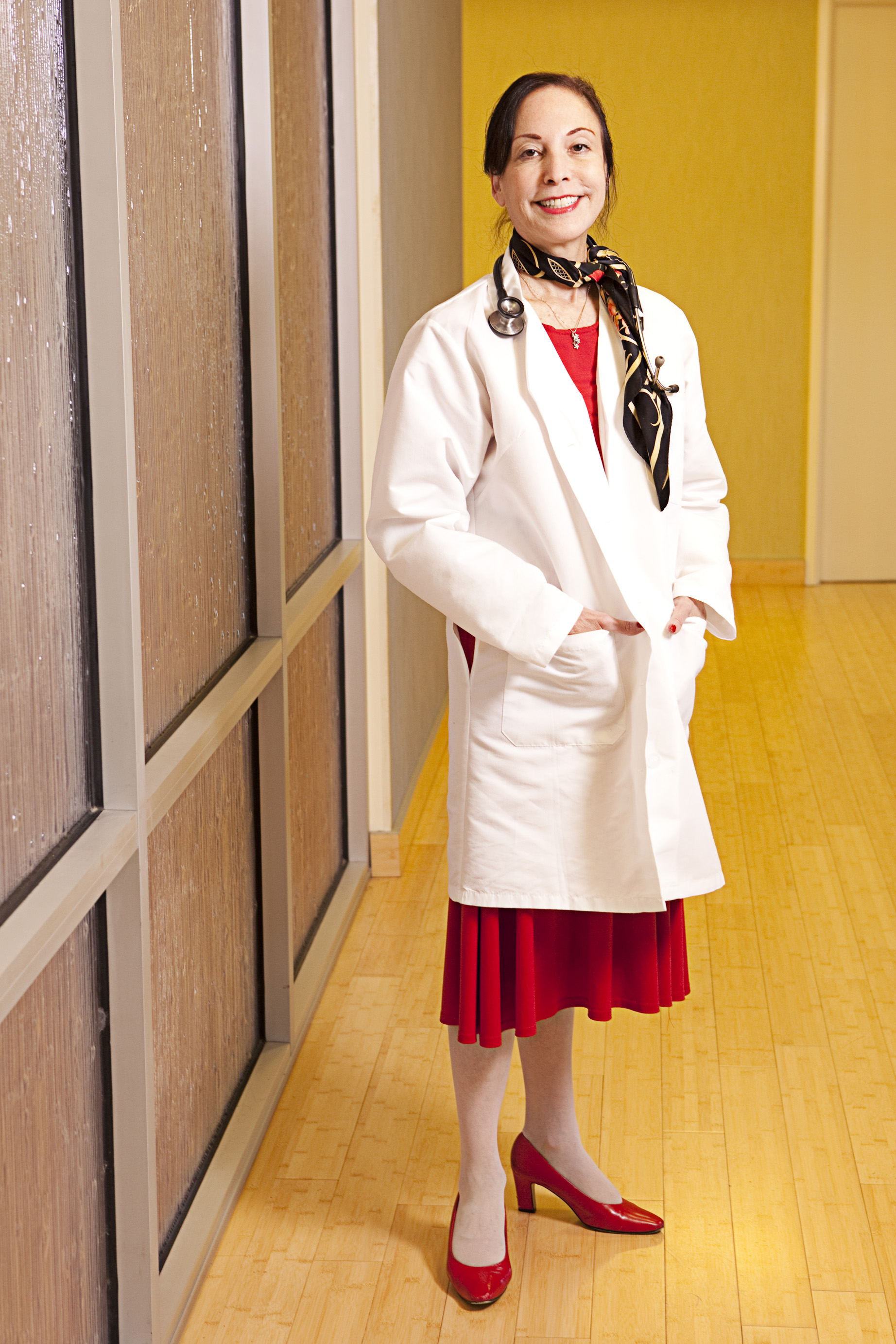
Dr. Lois Jovanovic at Sansum Diabetes Research Institute in Santa Barbara, CA

Lois Jovanovic (Serbian: Lois Jovanovič; May 2, 1947, in Minneapolis – September 18, 2018, Santa Barbara, California) was the chief executive officer and chief scientific officer of Sansum Diabetes Research Institute (SDRI) in Santa Barbara, California. Dr. Jovanovic performed her groundbreaking work at Sansum Diabetes Research Institute for 27 years, from 1986-2013, laying the foundation for current standards for care in diabetes and pregnancy. Dr. Lois Jovanovic is renowned around the world for her extraordinary contributions to medical science, specifically for pioneering the protocols that make it possible for women with diabetes to deliver healthy babies. Under Dr. Jovanovic's leadership, SDRI became a center of excellence for diabetes and pregnancy and artificial pancreas technology. Through community outreach, patient education, teaching, and working one-on-one with thousands of pregnant women, she has changed the world of diabetes and pregnancy. Dr. Jovanovic was responsible for establishing global guidelines of care adopted by the International Diabetes Federation and traveled extensively throughout the world teaching her protocols to physicians, nurses, dietitians, and educators.

== Early life and career ==
She was born Lois Gretchen Blaustone to pharmacist parents, Arnold Blaustone and Alice Dechter. A type 1 diabetic, Jovanovic was one of the creators of the Pocket Doc insulin dosage calculator.

Dr. Jovanovic began her academic career with a bachelor's degree in biology from Columbia University, followed by a master's degree in Hebrew Literature from The Jewish Theological Seminary in New York. She earned her medical degree from The Albert Einstein College of Medicine, completing her residency and fellowship in Internal Medicine, Endocrinology and Metabolism at the New York Hospital-Cornell University Medical College.

Dr. Jovanovic's groundbreaking work in diabetes and pregnancy began with her premise that a woman with diabetes' chances of having a healthy baby could be on a par with a healthy, non-diabetic woman, if she could achieve normoglycemia. In her beginning year of fellowship at Cornell, New York Hospital, her first research study showed that strict monitoring and absolute normalization of blood glucose could yield healthy babies. A year later, she published a larger trial of 52 diabetic women that showed conclusively that diabetic women, even those with severe disease, could have healthy babies (Am J Med 1981; 71: 921–27).

Dr. Jovanovic proceeded to develop a program to monitor a woman's blood glucose around the clock and provide treatment strategies to achieve and maintain normal blood glucose concentrations throughout pregnancy. These protocols for intensive insulin delivery set the standard for strict glucose control in pregnancy.

Dr. Jovanovic published more than 500 articles in the fields of diabetes, metabolism, nutrition, obstetrics and gynecology, perinatology and engineering of a glucose-controlled insulin delivery device. Her numerous honors, awards and appointments include the prestigious American Diabetes Association (ADA) 'Outstanding Physician Award' and the ADA 'Norbert Freinkel Award' for scholarship in the field of diabetes and pregnancy, the 'Clintec Award for Excellence' from The American College of Nutrition, the March of Dimes 'Agnes Higgins Award' and SDRI's 'William D. Sansum Award' for excellence in

In honor of Dr. Jovanovic, the Women's Interprofessional Network of the American Diabetes Association (WIN ADA) began annually presenting The Lois Jovanovic Transformative Woman in Diabetes Award in 2019. This award recognizes a woman scientist, clinician, educator, or other female professional who has made a significant impact in the field of diabetes and/or in the lives of people affected by the disease.

Sansum Diabetes Research Institute is keeping Dr. Jovanovic's legacy alive by expanding diabetes and pregnancy programs, and their artificial pancreas technology research.
