= Diabetes in the United States =

Death rate from diabetes gbd

Diabetes was the eighth leading cause of death in the United States in 2020. People with diabetes are twice as likely to develop heart disease or stroke as people without diabetes. There are three types of diabetes: Type 1, Type 2, and gestational (diabetes while pregnant). Type 2 diabetes accounts for 90%-95% of all cases. In 2017, approximately 24.7 million people were diagnosed with diabetes in the United States, approximately 7.6% of the total population (and 9th in the world).

Diabetes is the leading cause of kidney failure, non-traumatic lower-limb amputations, and blindness in adults. In 2023, approximately 40.1 million people in the US had diabetes, of which 11.0 million were undiagnosed adults.

Diabetes cost the United States approximately $327 billion in direct medical costs and lost productivity in 2017.

== Prevalence ==
The prevalence of diabetes is higher among:

- Men compared with women
- Adults ages 65 and older compared with adults ages 18–64
- Black and American Indian/Alaska Native adults compared with Asian adults
- Adults with less than a high school education compared with those with higher levels of education; the prevalence decreases as educational attainment increases
- Adults with an annual household income of less than $25,000 compared with those with higher levels of income
- Adults living in non-metropolitan areas are compared with those in metropolitan areas

Diabetes is the leading cause of kidney failure, non-traumatic lower-limb amputations and blindness in adults. Approximately 37.3 million adults currently have diabetes, of which 8.5 million remain undiagnosed.

Geographically, the United States has a diabetes belt with high diabetes prevalence estimates that includes Mississippi and portions of Alabama, Arkansas, Florida, Georgia, Kentucky, Louisiana, North Carolina, Ohio, Pennsylvania, South Carolina, Tennessee, Texas, Virginia, and West Virginia. .

estimated number, percentage, and awareness of prediabetes among adults aged 18 years or older, United States, 2017–2020 and 2019
Characteristic	Prediabetes, a 2019 estimates	Prediabetes, a 2017–2020 estimates Percentage	Prediabetes awareness, b 2017–2020 estimates Percentage
Total	96.0 (90.5–102.0)	38.0 (35.7–40.3)	19.0 (15.0–23.7)
Age group
18–44	32.2 (27.7–36.8)	27.8 (24.0–32.0)	13.8 (9.8–18.9)
45–64	37.4 (35.0–39.9)	44.8 (41.7–47.9)	20.6 (14.3–28.9)
≥65	26.4 (24.1–28.7)	48.8 (44.3–53.2)	23.0 (16.9–30.4)
Sex
Men	52.3 (48.0–56.6)	41.9 (38.4–45.6)	17.4 (13.4–22.2)
Women	43.7 (39.8–47.6)	34.3 (31.2–37.5)	20.9 (15.5–27.5)
Race-ethnicity
White, non-Hispanic	62.4 (57.4–67.4)	38.7 (35.5–41.9)	17.3 (11.8–24.7)
Black, non-Hispanic	12.4 (11.4–13.5)	39.2 (35.8–42.6)	21.9 (18.0–26.5)
Asian, non-Hispanic	6.0 (5.3–6.8)	37.3 (32.6–42.3)	30.1 (21.0–41.1)
Hispanic	14.3 (13.0–15.6)	34.5 (31.3–37.7)	20.9 (15.3–27.9)

== Prevention ==
Type 2 diabetes is affected by risk factors that can change, such as B. smoking, overweight and obesity, physical inactivity and high blood pressure and high cholesterol levels. Research shows that the onset of type 2 diabetes is largely preventable through weight loss, increased physical activity, and improvement. The National Diabetes Prevention Program, a partnership of public and private organizations working to prevent or delay type 2 diabetes, includes an evidence-based lifestyle change program that focuses on healthy eating and physical activity. Through the program, people with prediabetes have reduced their risk of developing Type 2 diabetes by 58%.

The National Clinical Care Commission report from the U.S. Department of Health and Human Services (HHS) discusses population-level strategies for federal programs in order to prevent and control diabetes. The report emphasizes the need for federal agencies to promote the consumption of water over sugar-sweetened beverages, support breastfeeding individuals, and expand housing opportunities for low-income individuals and families in areas with access to healthy food, green space, and walkability.

Diabetes management is critical to prevent complications from the disease. Diabetes can be controlled with a healthy diet, exercise, and insulin or oral diabetes medications. More information about the prevention and treatment of diabetes is available on the Centers for Disease Control and Prevention (CDC) website and through the American Diabetes Association.

== The cost of diabetes ==
Complicated diabetes is one of the twenty most costly diseases occurring during hospitalization in the United States. It was one of the top five most expensive conditions for uninsured patients. The economic cost of diabetes increased by 26% between 2012 and 2017 due to the increasing prevalence of diabetes and rising costs per person with diabetes. The estimated total cost of being diagnosed with diabetes in 2017 was US$327 billion, including US$237 billion in direct medical costs and US$90 billion in reduced productivity.

== See also ==
- Epidemiology of diabetes
