= Epidemiology of obesity =

Recognition of obesity as an epidemic

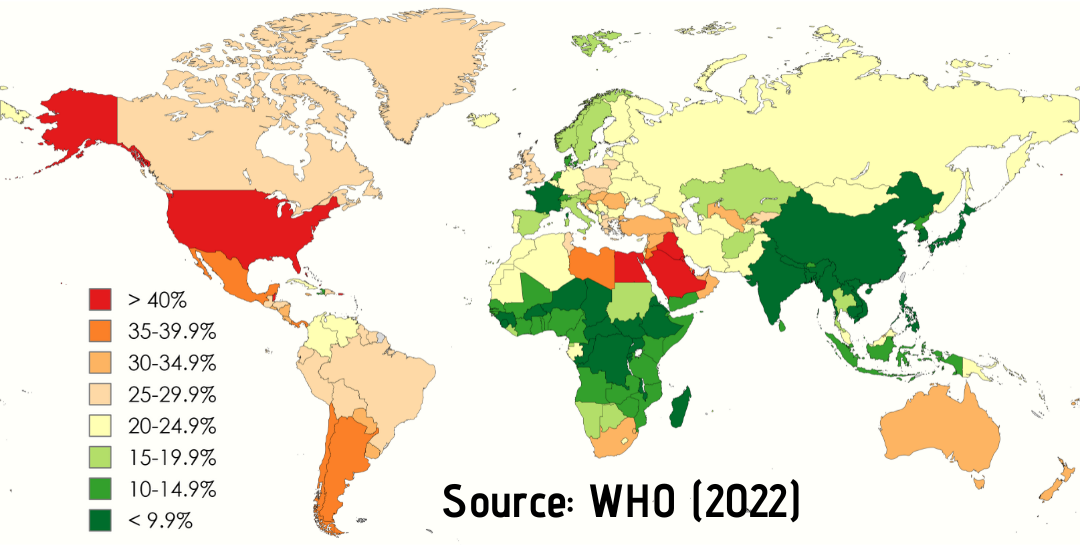
Share of adults with BMIs > 30 (2022)

World obesity prevalence among males: <5% 5-10% 10-15% 15-20% 20-25% 25-30% 30-35% 35-40% 40-45% 45-50% 50-55% >55%

World obesity prevalence among females: <5% 5-10% 10-15% 15-20% 20-25% 25-30% 30-35% 35-40% 40-45% 45-50% 50-55% >55%

Obesity has been observed throughout human history. Many early depictions of the human form in art and sculpture appear obese. However, it was not until the 20th century that obesity became common — so much so that, in 1997, the World Health Organization (WHO) formally recognized obesity as a global epidemic and estimated that the worldwide prevalence of obesity has nearly tripled since 1975. Obesity is defined as having a body mass index (BMI) greater than or equal to 30 kg/m^{2}, and in June 2013 the American Medical Association classified it as a disease.

In countries of the Organisation for Economic Co-operation and Development (OECD), one child out of five is overweight or obese. Once considered a problem only of high-income countries, obesity rates are rising worldwide. In 2014, the mean BMI in 128 countries was above the threshold for overweight. Globally, there are now more people who are obese than who are underweight, a trend observed in every region over the world except parts of sub-Saharan Africa and Asia. In 2013, an estimated 2.1 billion adults were overweight, as compared with 857 million in 1980. Of adults who are overweight, 31% are obese. Increases in obesity have been seen most in urban settings.

Since body fat can be measured in several ways, statistics on the epidemiology of obesity vary between sources. While BMI is the most basic and commonly used indicator of obesity, other measures include waist circumference, waist-to-hip ratio, skinfold thicknesses, and bioelectrical impedance. The rate of obesity increases with age at least up to 50 or 60 years old. Sex- and gender-based differences also influence the prevalence of obesity. Globally there are more obese women than men, but the numbers differ depending on how obesity is measured.

== Africa ==
Obesity rates in Western Africa are estimated to be 10%. Rates of obesity among women are three times those found in men. In urban West Africa rates of obesity doubled between the 1990s and 2000s.

=== Egypt ===
In Egypt, according to data from the 2016 Global Burden of Disease Study, overweight and obesity (as measured by high BMI) was the country's leading risk factor driving the most death and disability combined.

According to WHO data from 2022, Egypt has the highest obesity rate (44.3%) of any country in Africa.

== Asia ==
=== China ===
In the twenty first century, China faces challenges of obesity and chronic disease. This is believed to be primarily due to the rapid declines in physical activity and changing dietary habits which have occurred between the 1980s and the 2000s. The decline in physical activity is attributed to increasing technology in the workplace and changing leisure activities.

In 1989 65% of Chinese had jobs that required heavy labor. This decreased to 51% in the year 2000. Combined with this has been a change to a diet higher in meat and oil, and an increase in overall available calories. Available calories per person increased from 2,330 kilocalories (9,700 kJ) per day in 1980 to 2,940 kilocalories (12,300 kJ) per day in 2002. Rates of overweight and obese adults increased 12.9% in 1991 to 27.3% in 2004.

Overall rates of obesity are below 5% in China as a whole but are greater than 20% in some cities.

=== India ===
Obesity has reached epidemic proportions in India in the 21st century, with morbid obesity affecting 5% of the country's population. Obesity is a major risk factor for cardiovascular disease and NGOs such as the Indian Heart Association have been raising awareness about this issue. Urbanization and modernization has been associated with obesity. In Northern India obesity was most prevalent in urban populations (male = 5.5%, female = 12.6%), followed by the urban slums (male = 1.9%, female = 7.2%). Obesity rates were the lowest in rural populations (male = 1.6%, female = 3.8%).

Socioeconomic class also had an effect on the rate of obesity. Women of high socioeconomic class had rates of 10.4% as opposed to 0.9% in women of low socioeconomic class. With people moving into urban centers and wealth increasing, concerns about an obesity epidemic in India are growing.

=== Iran ===
In Iran the prevalence of obesity was 26.3% in 2008. Prevalence of obesity was more among women (39.5%) than men (14.5%).

=== Japan ===
Using the WHO criteria Japan has the lowest rate of obesity among the OECD member countries at 3.2%. However, as Asian populations are particularly susceptible to the health risks of excess adipose tissue, the Japanese have redefined obesity as any BMI greater than 25. Using this cut off value the prevalence of obesity in Japan would be 20%, a threefold increase from 1962 to 2002. A 2008 report stated that 28.6% of men and 20.6% of women in Japan were considered to be obese.

=== Pakistan ===
Changing lifestyles, owing to urbanisation, as well as diet issues are the main reasons for obesity in Pakistan. According to a recent study, approximately one out of four Pakistani adults (or 22.2% of individuals) are classified as obese.

=== Qatar ===
According to WHO data from 2022, Qatar has the highest rate of obesity (43.1%) of any country in Asia.

=== Taiwan ===
In 2002, 15% of children from 6 to 12 years of age were overweight; by gender, 15.5% of males and 14.4% of females were overweight. In the same age range, 12% of children were obese; by gender, 14.7% of males and 9.1% of females were categorized as obese. In 2005, 14.9% children from 6 to 12 years of age were overweight; by gender, 15.85% of males and 14.02% of females were overweight. 10.3% were categorized as obese; by gender, 10.92% of males and 9.73% of females were categorized as obese.

Based on these numbers, the trends were inconclusive, although with more than 10% of the age group being obese, obesity does appear to be a problem.

=== Vietnam ===
According to WHO data from 2022, Vietnam has the lowest obesity rate in the world at 2%.

== Europe ==
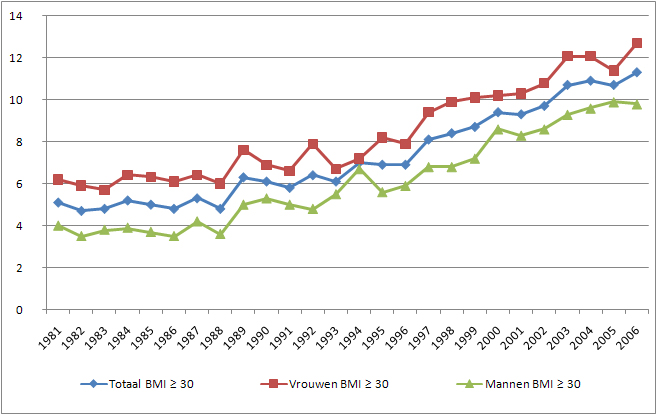
Rates of obesity in the Netherlands between 1981 and 2006

Between the 1970s and the 2000s, rates of obesity in most European countries have increased. During the 1990s and 2000s, the 27 countries making up the EU reported rates of obesity from 10 to 27% in men and from 10 to 38% in women.

The most recent combined Eurostat statistics, for 2009, show that, among the 19 EU Member States for which data are available, the proportion of obese people in the adult population varied in 2008/9 between 8.0% (Romania) and 23.9% (UK) for women and between 7.6% (Romania) and 24.7% (Malta) for men. Overall the UK had the highest proportions, and Romania the lowest. Men, the elderly and people with lower educations also have significantly higher obesity rates.

=== United Kingdom ===
In the UK the rate of obesity has increased about fourfold over the last 30 years, reaching levels of 22–24% in 2008/9.

Year	Percent males obese	Percent females obese
1980	6%	8%
1993	13%	16%
2000	21%	21%
2008/9	22%	24%

== North America ==
Obesity rates as a percentages of total population in OECD member countries in the years 1996–2003 (according to BMI)

Epidemiological data show that, among high-income countries, obesity prevalence is highest in the United States and Mexico.

=== Canada ===
The number of Canadians who are obese has risen dramatically in recent years. In 2004, direct measurements of height and weight found 23.1% of Canadians older than 18 had a BMI greater than 30. When broken down into degrees of obesity, 15.2% were class I (BMI 30–34.9), 5.1% were class II (BMI 35–39.9), and 2.7%, class III (BMI ≥ 40). This is in contrast to self-reported data the previous year of 15.2% and in 1978/1979 of 13.8%. The greatest increases occurred among the more severe degrees of obesity; class III obesity increased from 0.9% to 2.7% from 1978/1979 to 2004. Obesity in Canada varies by ethnicity; people of Aboriginal origin have a significantly higher rate of obesity (37.6%) than the national average.

In children obesity has substantially increased between 1989 and 2004 with rates in boys increasing from 2% to 10% and rates among girls increasing from 2% to 9%.

=== Mexico ===
Mexico has one of the highest rates of obesity among OECD countries, second only to the United States. To combat the epidemic, in 2014 Mexico implemented new taxes levied on food with excessive energy content and on sugar-sweetened beverages.

=== United States ===
The increase in obesity rates in the US as seen from 1985 to 2010 to the point where every state has at least a 20% obesity rate has caused it to become a significant focus of public health in recent years.

The percent of people per state who were obese (BMI>30) in 2011: > 30% 25% to < 30% 20% to < 25% 15% to < 20% 10% to < 15% < 10% No data

Obesity rates in the United States have nearly tripled since the 1960s. In 1962, about 13% of adult Americans were obese, and by 2002, obesity rates reached 33% of the adult population. According to the National Health and Nutrition Examination Study collected between the 1970s and 2004, the prevalence of overweight and obesity increased steadily among all groups of Americans. The numbers continue to rise; as of 2007, 33% of men and 36% of women were obese, and by 2015–2016, 39.6% of the total adult population (37.9% of men and 41.1% of women) had obesity. As of 2017–2018, 42.4% of U.S. adults aged 20 and over were obese (43% for men and 41.9% for women).

Obesity rates vary between diverse social groups, with some racial groups and low-income individuals more likely to be obese while other minorities show lower rates. As of 2014 the rates were as low as 12% for non-Hispanic Asian women and as high as 57% among African American women.

The incidence of obesity also varies with geography. The American South has been referred to as the "Stroke belt", "Obesity belt", or "Diabetes belt", to reflect the fact that residents of the region have high rates of these three conditions, compared to people of the same race/ethnicity elsewhere in the country.

Based on a study in 2008, estimates of obesity that rely on self-reported data arrive at a rate of 22% among non-Hispanic white females, whereas studies that involve direct measurement show that the rate was closer to 34% at that time.

The prevalence of class III (morbid) obesity (BMI ≥ 40) has increased the most dramatically, from 1.3% in the late 1970s, to 2.9% in 1988–94, to 4.7% in 2000, to 5.7% in 2008, and to 7.7% in 2014. Among African American women, its prevalence is estimated to be as high as 17%.

The rate of increase in the incidence of obesity began to slow in the 2000s, but as of 2014, obesity, severe obesity, and obesity in children continued to rise.

Prevalence of obesity between 1960 and 2004 in the USA

Obesity is one of the leading health issues in the United States, with some estimates suggesting that obesity results in about 300,000 excess deaths per year. However, in 2005 using different methodology, research at the Centers for Disease Control and Prevention produced a nationwide estimate of 129,000 excess deaths per year relative to individuals with a BMI of 21 to 25.

== South America and the Caribbean ==
Surveys in different Caribbean countries found that 7-20% of males and 22-48% of females over the age of 15 are obese. Trinidad and Tobago has the highest obesity in the Caribbean, with over 30% of its adult population overweight, ranking the country sixth in the world. The Bahamas have a major obesity epidemic: 48.6% of people between 15 and 64 years old are obese. A female adolescent from the Bahamas is more likely to be overweight than her male counterpart. In Jamaica, 7.2% of men over the age of 20 are obese, while 31.5% of women are obese.

=== Bahamas ===
According to WHO data from 2022, The Bahamas has the highest rate of obesity (47.3%) of any country in the Americas.

=== Chile ===
According to WHO data from 2022, Chile has the highest obesity rate (38.5%) of any country in South America.

== Oceania and the Pacific ==
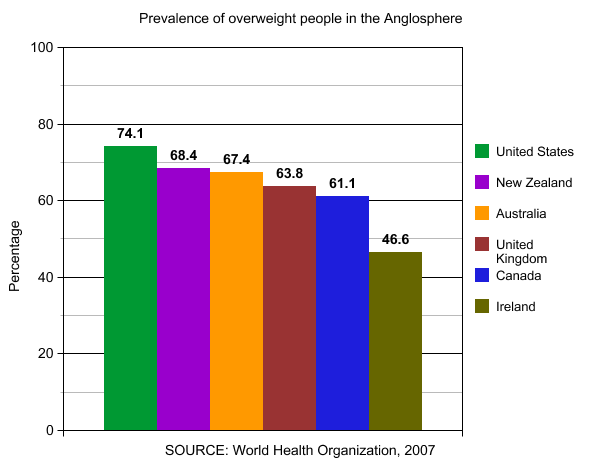
According to 2007 statistics from the World Health Organization (WHO), Australia has the third-highest prevalence of overweight adults in the English-speaking world.

=== Australia ===
Australia has a large obese population. According to self-reported and measured results of the 2007–2008 National Health Survey, 61% of Australians were overweight (above a 25 BMI), with 24% falling into the "obese" category (above a 30 BMI). Men were more likely to be overweight (67.7%) and obese (25.5%) than women (30.9% and 23.4% respectively).

=== New Zealand ===
Obesity in New Zealand has become an important national health concern in recent years, with high numbers of people afflicted in every age and ethnic group. In 2011/12, 28.4% of New Zealand adults were obese, a number only surpassed in the English-speaking world by the United States.

=== South Pacific ===
Many of the island nations of the South Pacific have very high rates of obesity. Nauru has the highest rates of obesity in the world (94.5%) followed by Samoa, the Federated States of Micronesia, and the American Samoa. Being big has traditionally been associated with health, beauty, and status and many of these beliefs remain prevalent today.

== Statistics ==
Estimated prevalence of obesity with BMI >= 30 among adults by country according to World Health Organization for year 2022:

Country	Obesity prevalence among adults in %		
Country	All	Female	Male
Afghanistan	19.2	23.7	14.5
Albania	23.4	25.2	21.4
Algeria	23.8	32.3	15.5
American Samoa	75.2	80.4	69.4
Andorra	18.1	15.6	20.5
Angola	11.5	16.3	6.3
Antigua and Barbuda	33.2	41.7	23.8
Argentina	35.4	36.3	34.4
Armenia	24.5	28.0	19.0
Australia	30.2	29.3	31.2
Austria	15.4	12.3	18.4
Azerbaijan	26.6	32.6	19.5
Bahamas	47.3	55.1	38.7
Bahrain	36.1	43.1	32.0
Bangladesh	5.3	7.6	2.9
Barbados	38.0	48.1	27.1
Belarus	21.4	22.6	19.3
Belgium	20.0	20.9	19.2
Belize	42.3	51.8	32.7
Benin	11.2	15.0	7.1
Bermuda	33.0	41.7	23.8
Bhutan	12.2	15.6	9.3
Bolivia	28.7	34.3	22.8
Bosnia and Herzegovina	21.2	20.6	21.5
Botswana	18.3	27.2	8.4
Brazil	28.1	31.7	24.3
Brunei	31.7	33.5	30.0
Bulgaria	20.6	17.9	23.1
Burkina Faso	6.8	9.3	4.0
Burundi	5.0	4.0	6.1
Cabo Verde	15.8	22.9	8.4
Cambodia	4.4	5.6	3.0
Cameroon	14.9	20.4	9.3
Canada	26.2	24.9	27.6
Central African Republic	9.3	12.3	6.1
Chad	6.7	6.0	7.4
Chile	38.9	44.3	33.4
China	8.3	7.6	8.8
Colombia	23.6	28.9	17.9
Comoros	16.3	24.6	8.0
Cook Islands	68.9	72.0	65.3
Costa Rica	31.4	37.8	24.8
Croatia	30.6	27.2	33.6
Cuba	21.8	24.9	18.5
Cyprus	22.9	20.2	25.5
Czech Republic	26.0	22.3	29.5
DR Congo	6.6	9.0	4.2
Denmark	13.3	11.2	15.3
Djibouti	11.4	16.3	6.1
Dominica	31.3	44.6	17.9
Dominican Republic	29.3	35.4	23.2
East Timor	2.4	3.2	1.6
Ecuador	27.4	32.3	22.2
Egypt	44.3	57.1	31.3
El Salvador	30.9	37.3	22.8
Equatorial Guinea	17.7	29.6	7.8
Eritrea	4.8	6.6	2.8
Estonia	22.2	21.3	22.4
Eswatini	30.1	43.9	15.0
Ethiopia	2.8	4.5	1.1
Fiji	33.8	41.8	25.6
Finland	21.5	21.6	21.3
France	9.7	9.6	9.8
French Polynesia	48.1	50.1	46.1
Gabon	21.0	31.6	11.0
Georgia	34.7	34.9	33.3
Germany	20.4	18.4	22.3
Ghana	12.9	20.3	5.2
Greece	28.0	26.7	29.1
Greenland	27.0	30.6	23.7
Grenada	30.2	41.9	18.5
Guatemala	26.8	31.3	21.9
Guinea	9.5	12.7	5.9
Guinea-Bissau	11.5	14.8	7.6
Guyana	28.5	38.2	17.6
Haiti	10.7	14.7	6.5
Honduras	29.5	36.0	22.9
Hungary	31.7	27.9	35.2
Iceland	21.2	19.4	23.0
India	7.3	9.4	5.2
Indonesia	11.2	16.1	6.4
Iran	24.3	30.8	17.8
Iraq	40.5	48.1	32.3
Ireland	28.4	27.2	29.6
Israel	22.5	21.8	23.1
Italy	17.3	17.0	17.4
Ivory Coast	11.6	15.7	7.7
Jamaica	33.8	48.1	18.8
Japan	5.5	3.5	7.5
Jordan	38.5	44.3	33.0
Kazakhstan	18.4	18.0	18.3
Kenya	12.4	18.5	6.0
Kiribati	46.3	55.6	35.4
Kuwait	41.4	48.3	38.1
Kyrgyzstan	26.6	28.3	24.0
Laos	8.0	10.1	5.9
Latvia	24.3	23.0	24.8
Lebanon	29.8	30.5	28.7
Lesotho	21.0	32.7	8.4
Liberia	17.0	21.0	12.8
Libya	36.7	45.9	27.2
Lithuania	25.4	23.1	26.8
Luxembourg	18.4	16.5	20.3
Madagascar	4.3	4.1	4.5
Malawi	7.7	11.8	3.1
Malaysia	22.1	26.8	17.6
Maldives	17.3	23.6	12.9
Mali	11.4	12.9	9.9
Malta	32.3	28.7	35.2
Marshall Islands	45.9	54.8	37.1
Mauritania	22.7	35.0	8.9
Mauritius	19.2	25.3	12.9
Mexico	36.0	40.1	31.4
Micronesia	47.1	55.8	38.0
Moldova	23.0	24.1	21.1
Mongolia	24.1	26.0	21.6
Montenegro	18.0	15.4	20.5
Morocco	21.8	30.2	13.3
Mozambique	10.3	13.7	6.2
Myanmar	7.4	9.3	5.5
Namibia	17.0	22.8	10.2
Nauru	69.9	71.0	68.6
Nepal	7.0	8.9	4.8
Netherlands	14.5	14.5	14.5
New Zealand	33.6	35.0	32.3
Nicaragua	33.6	38.8	27.8
Niger	6.0	7.6	4.4
Nigeria	12.4	16.5	8.2
Niue	66.6	69.7	62.7
North Korea	10.8	13.0	8.5
North Macedonia	27.5	26.7	28.1
Norway	19.2	17.7	20.5
Oman	31.1	39.9	26.2
Pakistan	23.0	26.0	20.0
Palau	41.1	44.0	38.2
Palestine	37.6	45.4	28.8
Panama	36.1	43.1	29.0
Papua New Guinea	20.5	25.2	16.0
Paraguay	33.0	35.9	29.8
Peru	27.3	31.5	22.9
Philippines	8.7	10.3	7.2
Poland	27.5	23.7	31.0
Portugal	21.8	22.2	21.2
Puerto Rico	41.1	45.8	35.8
Qatar	43.1	50.8	40.3
Republic of the Congo	8.5	12.8	4.2
Romania	34.0	30.7	37.1
Russia	24.2	24.0	23.4
Rwanda	4.9	7.8	1.8
Saint Kitts and Nevis	45.6	53.8	36.7
Saint Lucia	33.5	46.1	20.4
Samoa	62.4	73.6	51.3
Saudi Arabia	40.6	46.6	37.3
Senegal	10.2	15.5	3.9
Serbia	22.5	19.3	25.5
Seychelles	29.4	39.6	20.2
Sierra Leone	7.1	11.4	2.7
Singapore	13.9	11.5	15.9
Slovakia	26.8	23.1	30.4
Slovenia	19.4	13.7	24.7
Solomon Islands	22.6	27.8	17.5
Somalia	14.6	22.9	5.8
South Africa	30.8	45.8	13.9
South Korea	7.3	5.6	8.8
South Sudan	8.6	11.8	5.1
Spain	15.7	12.6	18.7
Sri Lanka	10.6	14.2	6.6
St. Vincent and Grenadines	33.2	48.4	18.7
Sudan	17.0	22.3	11.4
Suriname	29.0	38.5	19.1
Sweden	15.3	13.7	16.7
Switzerland	12.1	9.6	14.6
Syria	33.9	41.2	26.0
São Tomé and Príncipe	16.5	23.3	9.7
Tajikistan	23.8	27.4	19.8
Tanzania	12.6	18.3	6.5
Thailand	15.4	18.4	12.2
The Gambia	14.9	20.0	9.5
Togo	11.6	17.4	5.6
Tokelau	69.8	73.6	65.8
Tonga	71.6	80.1	62.3
Trinidad and Tobago	28.0	33.5	22.4
Tunisia	26.8	33.8	19.3
Turkey	33.3	40.9	25.2
Turkmenistan	21.4	23.6	18.8
Tuvalu	64.2	71.6	56.8
Uganda	7.9	11.3	4.1
Ukraine	23.6	26.5	19.9
United Arab Emirates	32.1	39.4	28.6
United Kingdom	26.8	27.6	26.1
United States of America	42.0	43.2	40.8
Uruguay	33.3	35.6	30.7
Uzbekistan	30.0	32.7	26.8
Vanuatu	21.3	26.1	16.4
Venezuela	22.7	24.9	20.2
Vietnam	2.0	2.0	1.9
Yemen	13.6	17.0	10.1
Zambia	11.1	16.4	5.1
Zimbabwe	14.2	20.9	5.5

== See also ==
- Food industry
- Food politics
- Epidemiology of childhood obesity
- Epidemiology of metabolic syndrome
- Obesogen
- Overnutrition
- Sugar industry
- Ultra-processed food
- World Health Organization
