= International Diabetes Federation =

Global alliance of diabetes associations

- Formation: 1950
- Founded at: Amsterdam, The Netherlands
- Headquarters: Avenue Herrmann-Debroux 54 B-1160 Brussels, Belgium
- Members: 240 national diabetes associations in 161 countries and territories
- President: Peter EH Schwarz
- Website: idf.org

The International Diabetes Federation (IDF) is an umbrella organization of over 240 national diabetes associations in more than 161 countries and territories. It is headquartered in Brussels, Belgium.

== Organization ==
The International Diabetes Federation is divided into seven regions: Africa (AFR), Europe (EUR), Middle East and North Africa (MENA), North America and Caribbean (NAC), South and Central America (SACA), South East Asia (SEA) and Western Pacific (WP).

The organization is associated with the Department of Public Information of the United Nations and is in official relations with the World Health Organization.

== Global Initiatives ==
World Diabetes Day (WDD) is a global campaign led by the International Diabetes Federation to promote awareness of diabetes. It is observed annually on November 14.

Diabetes Voice is the quarterly magazine of the IDF. It reports on political, professional, and humanitarian campaigns and outreach initiatives.

The IDF also holds Global Diabetes Walk events to raise awareness of diabetes.
