= Triphenyltin compounds =

Triphenyltin compounds are organotin compounds with the general formula (C_{6}H_{5})_{3}SnX. They contain the triphenyltin group, (C_{6}H_{5})_{3}Sn, or Ph_{3}Sn, which consists of an atom of tin bonded to three phenyl groups. Examples of triphenyltins include:

- Triphenyltin hydride, Ph_{3}SnH
- Triphenyltin hydroxide, Ph_{3}SnOH
- Triphenyltin chloride, Ph_{3}SnCl
- Triphenyltin acetate, Ph_{3}SnOAc

Triphenyltin compounds have been used extensively as algicides and molluscicides in antifouling products since the 1960s, together with tributyltin compounds, and both these classes of compounds are of local (but not global) environmental concern because they are persistent organic pollutants. They are also used in organic synthesis to generate radicals or cleave carbon-oxygen bonds.
