= Oligodynamic effect =

Toxic effect of metal ions on living cells

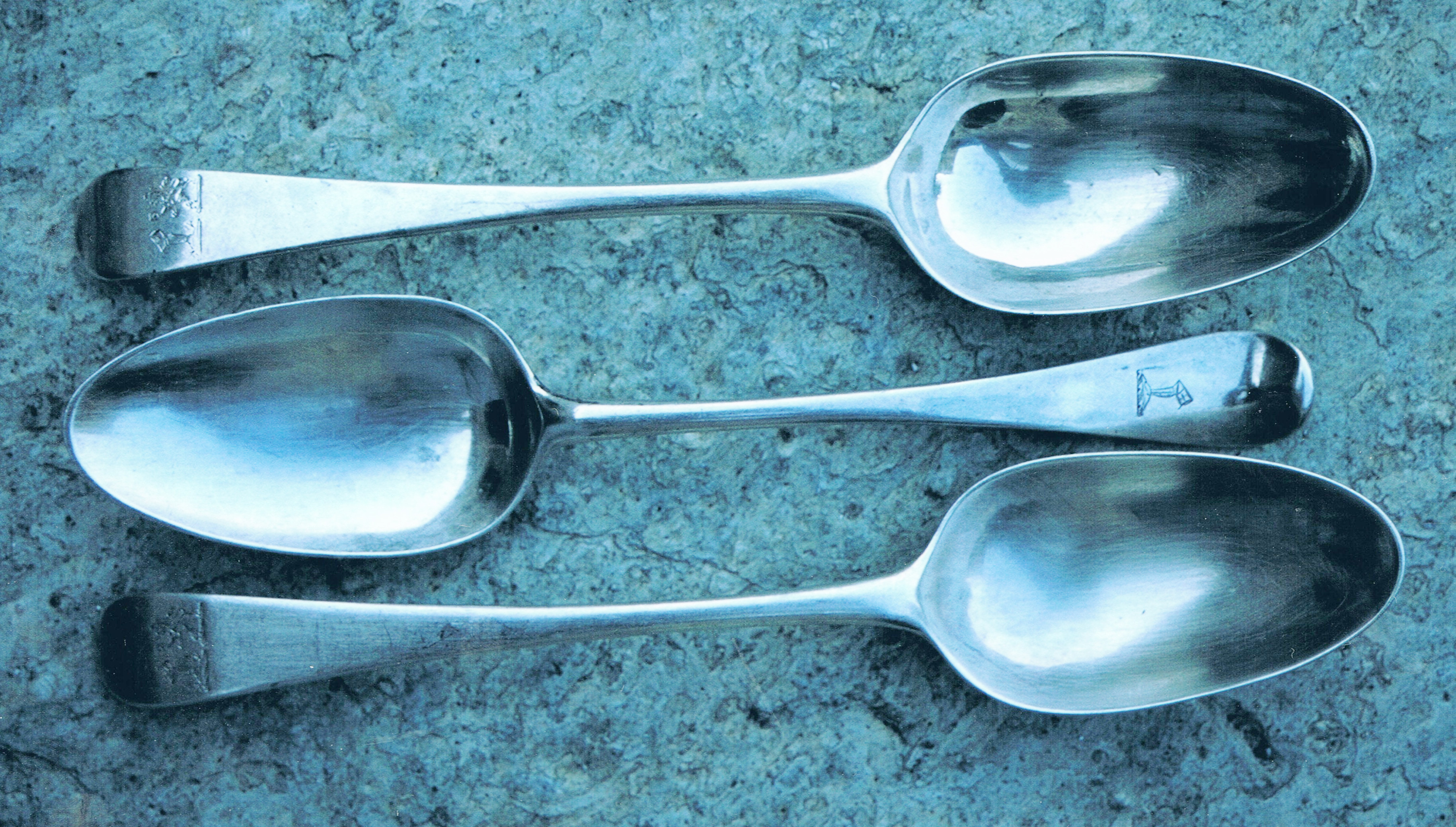
Silver spoons self-sanitize due to the oligodynamic effect

The oligodynamic effect (from Greek oligos, "few", and dynamis, "force") is a biocidal effect of metals, especially heavy metals, that occurs even in low concentrations. This effect is attributed to the antibacterial behavior of metal ions, which are absorbed by bacteria upon contact and damage their cell membranes.

In modern times, the effect was observed by Carl Nägeli, although he did not identify the cause. Brass doorknobs, brass handrails, electroculture atmospheric antennas made with copper, copper moscow mule mugs, tools, jewelry, and silverware all exhibit this effect to an extent.

== Mechanism ==
The metals react with thiol (-SH) or amine (-NH_{(1,2,3)}) groups of proteins, a mode of action to which microorganisms may develop resistance. Such resistance may be transmitted by plasmids.

== List of uses ==
=== Aluminium ===
Aluminium has been found to compete with iron and magnesium and bind to DNA, membranes, or cell walls, leading to its toxic effect on microbes, such as cyanobacteria, soil bacteria and mycorrhizal fungi.

Aluminium triacetate (Burow's solution) is used as an astringent mild antiseptic.

=== Antimony ===
Orthoesters of diarylstibinic acids are fungicides and bactericides, used in paints, plastics, and fibers. Trivalent organic antimony was used in therapy for schistosomiasis.

=== Arsenic ===
Arsenic was historically used to treat syphilis, and is still used in sheep dips, rat poisons, wood preservatives, weed killers, and other pesticides. Arsenic is poisonous to humans.

=== Barium ===
Barium polysulfide is a fungicide and acaricide used in fruit and grape growing.

=== Bismuth ===
Bismuth has been used to treat syphilis and malaria and is still used in vulnerary salves, vulnerary powders, and antimycotics.

=== Boron ===
Boric acid esters derived from glycols (example, organo-borate formulation, Biobor JF) are used to control microorganisms in fuel systems with water.

=== Copper ===
Brass vessels are used to kill fecal bacteria in stored water; they do this by releasing copper ions. Copper sulfate is used as an algicide in reservoirs, stock ponds, swimming pools, and fish tanks, and when combined with lime (Bordeaux mixture) is used as a fungicide and antihelminthic.

Copper 8-hydroxyquinoline is sometimes included in paint to prevent mildew.

Paint containing copper is used on boat bottoms to prevent barnacle growth (biofouling).

Copper also has the ability to destroy viruses, such as influenza viruses, noroviruses or human immunodeficiency virus (HIV).

This is why heavy, unlacquered brass was once the standard for high-touch surface areas, such as doorknobs, push plates, and handrails.

=== Gold ===
Gold is used in dental inlays and inhibits the growth of bacteria.

=== Lead ===
Lead arsenate is used in insecticides and herbicides. Organic lead compounds have been used as biocides, including thiomethyl triphenyllead (antifungal agent, cotton preservative, and lubricant additive), thiopropyl triphenyllead (rodent repellant), tributyllead acetate(wood and cotton preservative), and tributyllead imidazole (lubricant additive and cotton preservative).

=== Mercury ===
Dental amalgam used in fillings inhibits bacterial reproduction.

Phenylmercury salts such as phenylmercuric borate and acetate were used as disinfectants, but have been largely discontinued due to their mercury content. Organic mercury compounds have been used as disinfectants and in preservatives and mercurials are used in agriculture as in insecticides and fungicides.

=== Nickel ===
The toxicity of nickel to bacteria, yeasts, and fungi differs considerably.

=== Silver ===
Silver ions, when at concentrations of 0.01–0.1 mg/L, negatively impact bacterial metabolism.

Silver sulfadiazine is used as an antiseptic ointment for extensive burns.

=== Thallium ===
Thallium compounds have been used to kill fungal spore and bacteria in wood and leather and to protect against moths in textiles; thallium sulfate has been used to treat venereal disease, skin fungal infections, and tuberculosis.

=== Tin ===
Tricyclohexyltin hydroxide is used as an acaricide. Triphenyltin hydroxide and triphenyltin acetate are used as fungicides.

=== Zinc ===
Zinc oxide is used as a weak antiseptic and in paints as a white pigment and mold-growth inhibitor. Zinc chloride is a common ingredient in mouthwashes and deodorants. Zinc pyrithione is an ingredient in antidandruff shampoos. In roofing, galvanized fittings zinc-treated shingles are used to impede algae growth. Zinc iodide and zinc sulfate are used as topical antiseptics.

== See also ==
- Antimicrobial properties of copper
- Bacteriostatic agent
- Copper-silver ionization
- Medical uses of silver

== Links ==
- Lilaria, Khushboo; Gupta, Nisha; Paul, Jai Shankar; Jadhav, Shailesh Kumar (31 December 2020). "Comparative Analysis of Oligodynamic Virtue of Various Metals on Bacterial Population". NewBioWorld. 2 (2): 8–12. doi:10.52228/NBW-JAAB.2020-2-2-3.
