= Triphenyltin hydride =

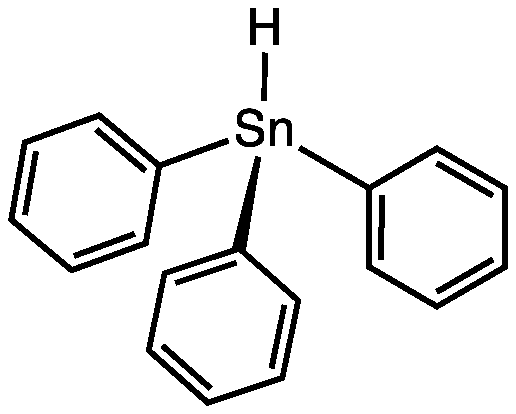

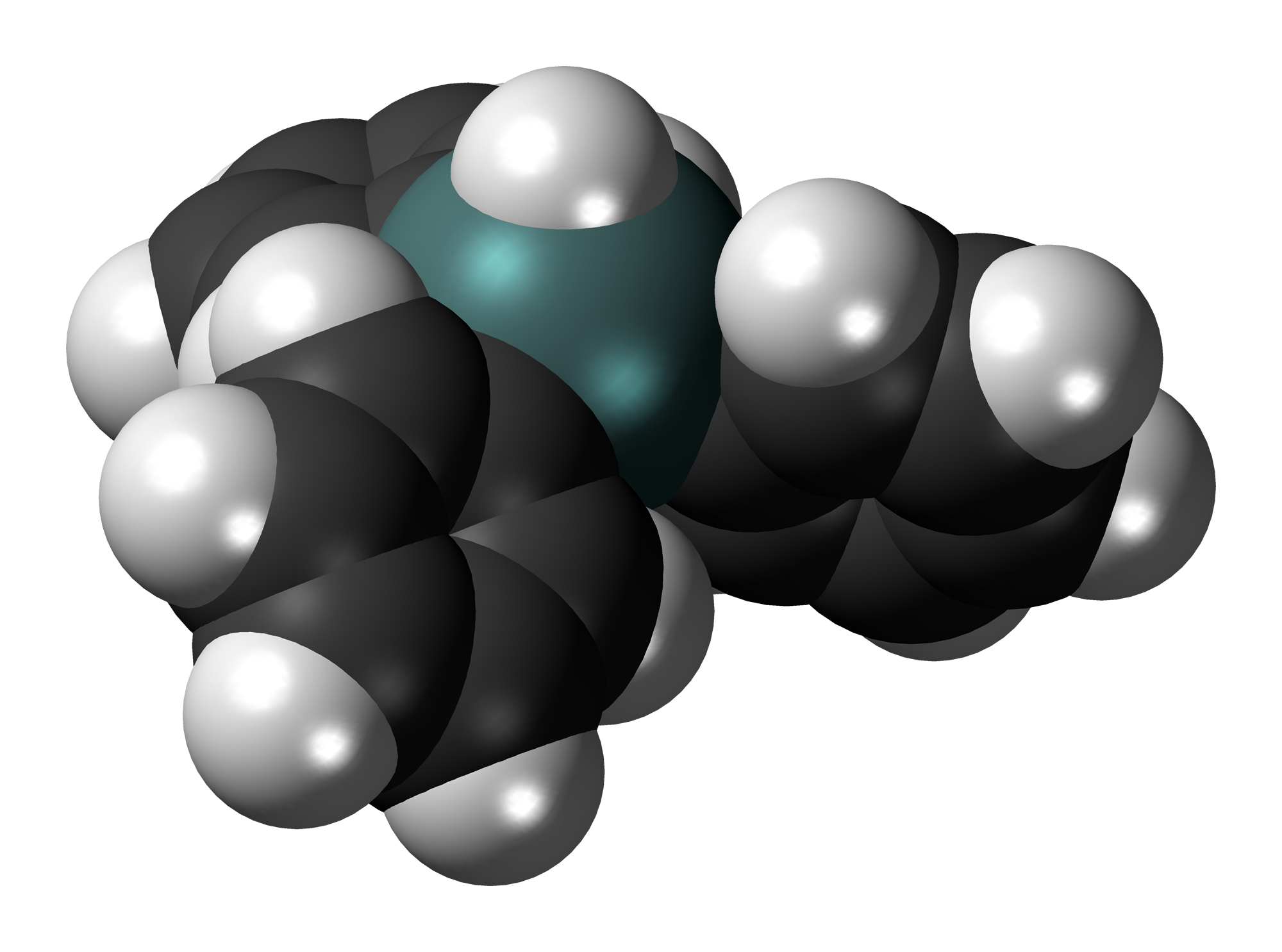

Names
- IUPAC name Triphenylstannane

Identifiers
CAS Number	892-20-6
3D model (JSmol)	Interactive image; Interactive image
Beilstein Reference	3544353
ChEBI	CHEBI:30537
ChemSpider	6217
ECHA InfoCard	100.011.789
EC Number	212-967-8
Gmelin Reference	6741
PubChem CID	6460
RTECS number	WH8882000
UNII	95T92AGN0V
CompTox Dashboard (EPA)	DTXSID40893312
- InChI: InChI=1S/3C6H5.Sn.H/c3*1-2-4-6-5-3-1;;/h3*1-5H;; Key: NFHRNKANAAGQOH-UHFFFAOYSA-N
- SMILES: [H][Sn](C2=CC=CC=C2)(C3=CC=CC=C3)C1=CC=CC=C1; c1c(cccc1)[Sn](c2ccccc2)c3ccccc3

Properties
Chemical formula	C_{18}H_{16}Sn
Molar mass	351.036 g·mol^{−1}
Appearance	colorless oil
Density	1.374 g/cm^{3}
Melting point	28 °C (82 °F; 301 K)
Boiling point	156 °C (313 °F; 429 K) (0.15 mm Hg)
Solubility in water	insoluble
Solubility in benzene, THF	soluble

Hazards
- Occupational safety and health (OHS/OSH)
Main hazards	toxic
- GHS labelling
Pictograms	(GHS06: Toxic) (GHS09: Environmental hazard)
Signal word	Danger
Hazard statements	H301, H311, H331, H410
Flash point	>230 °F

Related compounds
Related compounds	SnCl_{4}, (C_{6}H_{5})_{3}SnCl, (C_{6}H_{5})_{3}SnOH
- Except where otherwise noted, data are given for materials in their standard state (at 25 °C [77 °F], 100 kPa). verify (what is ?) Infobox references

Triphenyltin hydride is the organotin compound with the formula (C_{6}H_{5})_{3}SnH, often abbreviated as Ph_{3}SnH, where Ph stands for phenyl. It is a colorless distillable oil that is soluble in organic solvents. It is often used as a source of "H·" to generate radicals or cleave carbon-oxygen bonds.

== Preparation and reactions ==
Ph_{3}SnH, as it is more commonly abbreviated, is prepared by treatment of triphenyltin chloride with lithium aluminium hydride. Although Ph_{3}SnH is treated as a source of "H·", in fact it does not release free hydrogen atoms, which are extremely reactive species. Instead, Ph_{3}SnH transfers H to substrates usually via a radical chain mechanism. This reactivity exploits the relatively good stability of "Ph_{3}Sn·"
