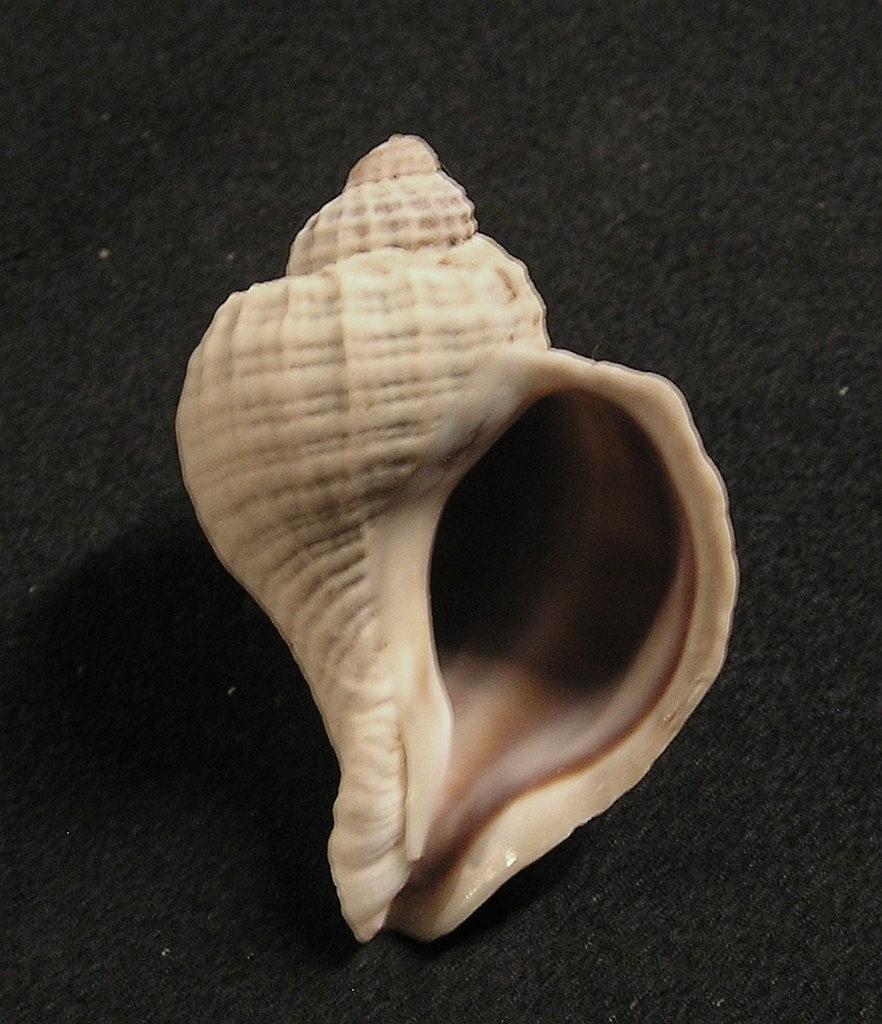
- Trophon geversianus acordonada

Scientific classification
- Kingdom: Animalia
- Phylum: Mollusca
- Class: Gastropoda
- Subclass: Caenogastropoda
- Order: Neogastropoda
- Family: Muricidae
- Genus: Trophon
- Species: T. geversianus

Binomial name
- Trophon geversianus (Pallas, 1774)

Synonyms
- Buccinum fimbriatum Martyn, 1784; Buccinum geversianus Pallas, 1774; Fusus inflatus Hombron, J.B. & C.H. Jacquinot, 1852 not Dunker, 1847; Fusus intermedius Hupé in Gay, 1854; Murex fimbriatus [Lightfoot], 1786; Murex foliatus Schumacher, 1817; Murex magellanicus Gmelin, 1791; Murex peruvianus Lamarck, 1816; Murex varians d'Orbigny, 1841; Murex ventricosa Molina, 1810; Polyplex bulbosa Perry, 1811; Trophon geversianus var. calva Kobelt, 1878; Trophon geversianus var. lirata Kobelt, 1878; Trophon philippianus Dunker in Kobelt, 1878; Trophon varians (d'Orbigny, 1841)

= Trophon geversianus =

Species of gastropod

Trophon geversianus, commonly known as Gevers's trophon, is a species of sea snail, a marine gastropod mollusk in the family Muricidae, the murex snails or rock snails.

The two varieties Trophon geversianus var. calva Kobelt, 1878 and Trophon geversianus var. lirata Kobelt, 1878 have been synonymized with Trophon geversianus (Pallas, 1774)

== Description ==
The size of an adult shell varies between 30 mm and 111 mm. Highly variable. Aperture greater than 1/2 of length, brown to violaceous (always coloured). Exterior with strong lamellae. Also with spiral cords, alone or forming a reticulate with the lamellae, or smooth. Brown to whitish, dull. Feeding Mytilidae on intertidal rocks.

== Distribution ==
This species is found in the Atlantic Ocean off Argentina, the Falkland Islands and Tierra del Fuego, Chile.

== Imposex ==
The phenomenon known as imposex, the development of nonfunctional male sexual organs in female individuals, has been observed in T. geversianus. This condition is triggered by exposure to organic tin compounds such as tributyltin (TBT) and triphenyltin (TPT), is irreversible, and can have severe consequences for gastropod species, ranging from individual sterilization to potential population collapse. Organotin compounds are commonly used as biocides and antifouling agents, added to marine paints to prevent organisms from growing on the hulls of boats and ships. As a result, high concentrations often accumulate in the waters around shipyards and docking areas, posing a serious threat to nearby marine life through prolonged exposure.
