= Tributyltin azide =

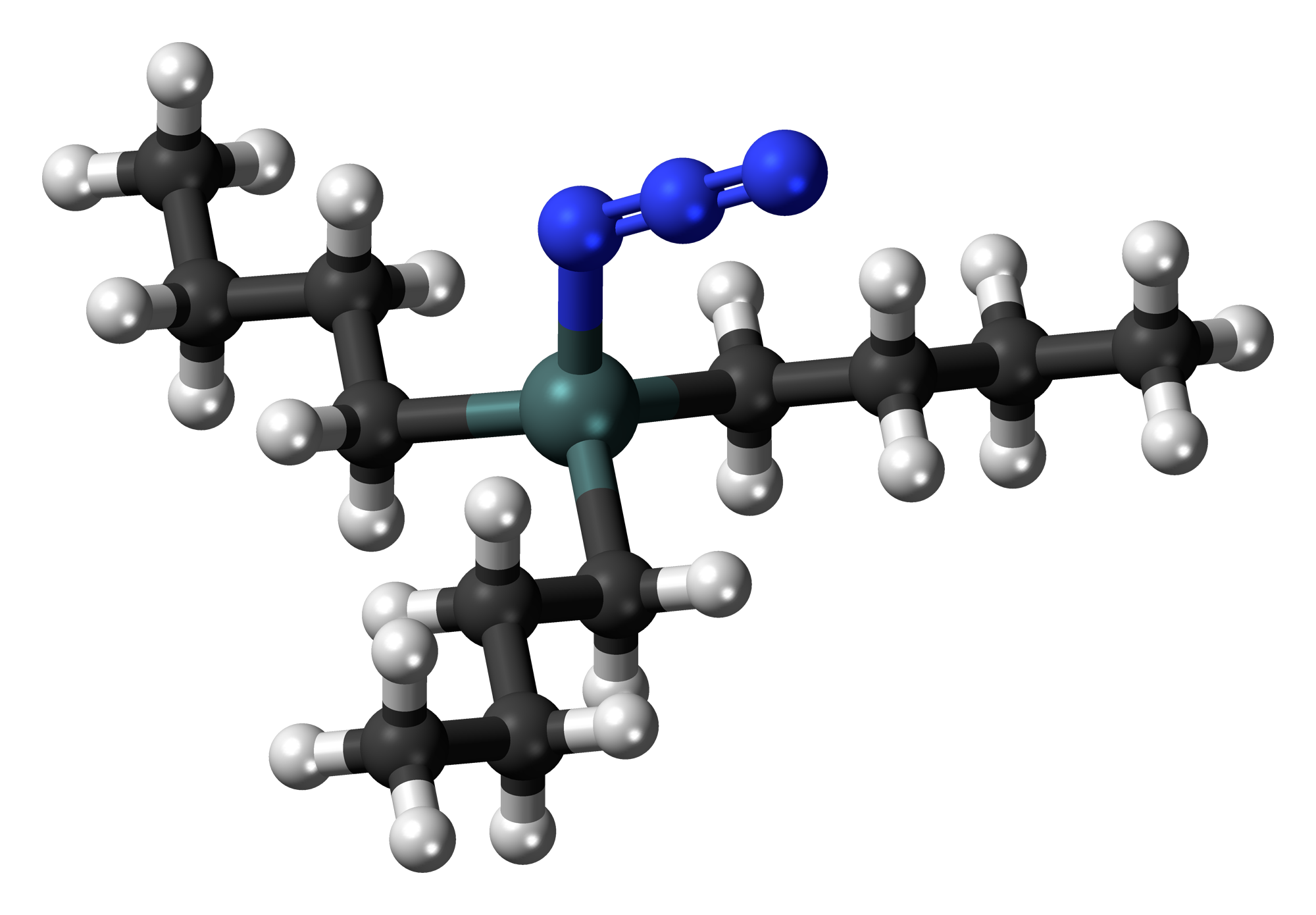

Names
- Preferred IUPAC name Azidotri(butyl)stannane
- Other names: Tri-n-butylazidotin; Tributyltin azide; Azidotributyltin; Azidotributyltin(iv); Azidotributylstannane; Nsc179738

Identifiers
CAS Number	17846-68-3
3D model (JSmol)	Interactive image
Abbreviations	TBSnA
ChemSpider	21473438
ECHA InfoCard	100.133.218
EC Number	605-822-9
PubChem CID	4984872
UNII	H29BF5PHC5
CompTox Dashboard (EPA)	DTXSID00407252
- InChI: InChI=1S/3C4H9.N3.Sn/c3*1-3-4-2;1-3-2;/h3*1,3-4H2,2H3;;/q;;;-1;+1 Key: JKVRTUCVPZTEQZ-UHFFFAOYSA-N
- SMILES: CCCC[Sn](CCCC)(CCCC)N=[N+]=[N-]

Properties
Chemical formula	C_{12}H_{27}N_{3}Sn
Molar mass	332.079 g·mol^{−1}
Appearance	Colorless to light yellow liquid or white solid
Density	1.212 g/mL
Boiling point	120 °C (248 °F; 393 K) at 0.2 mmHg
Solubility in water	Reacts

Hazards
- GHS labelling
Pictograms	(GHS06: Toxic) (GHS07: Exclamation mark) (GHS08: Health hazard) (GHS09: Environmental hazard)
Signal word	Danger
Hazard statements	H301, H312, H315, H319, H372, H410
Precautionary statements	P260, P264, P270, P273, P280, P301+P310, P302+P352, P305+P351+P338, P312, P314, P321, P322, P330, P332+P313, P337+P313, P362, P363, P391, P405, P501
Flash point	> 110 °C (230 °F; 383 K)
- Lethal dose or concentration (LD, LC)
LD_{50} (median dose)	400 mg/kg (oral, rat)
- Except where otherwise noted, data are given for materials in their standard state (at 25 °C [77 °F], 100 kPa). verify (what is ?) Infobox references

Tributyltin azide is an organotin compound with the formula (C_{4}H_{9})_{3}SnN_{3}. It is a colorless solid although samples can appear as yellow oils. The compound is used as a reagent in organic synthesis.

== Synthesis and reactions ==
Tributyltin azide is synthesized by the salt metathesis reaction of tributyltin chloride and sodium azide.

It is a reagent used in the synthesis of tetrazoles, which in turn are used to generate angiotensin II receptor antagonists. In some applications, tributyltin azide has been replaced by the less toxic trioctyltin azide and organoaluminium azides.

== Safety ==
Tributyl tin compounds are highly toxic and have penetrating odors. Tributyltin azide causes skin rashes, itching or blisters.
