= Stannoxane =

Stannoxane is a functional group in organotin chemistry with the connectivity Sn^{IV}−O−Sn^{IV} (IV indicates the oxidation state of tin). Aside from the oxide group, usually 3 or 4 other substituents are attached to tin. In aqueous or aquatic environments, most organotin compounds contain this group.

Dibutyltin oxide adopts a polymeric structure with many stannoxane linkages (Bu is butyl −CH_{2}CH_{2}CH_{2}CH_{3})

== Synthesis and formation ==
Stannoxanes form upon hydrolysis of organotin halides. For example, hydrolysis of dibutyltin dichloride gives the tetratin compound (((CH_{3}(CH_{2})_{3})_{2}ClSn)_{2}O)_{2}. The hydrolysis appears to proceed via organotin hydroxides. For example, the commercially important cyhexatin (C_{6}H_{11})_{3}SnOH converts at 200 °C into the hexacyclohexyldistannoxane:

2 (C_{6}H_{11})_{3}SnOH → ((C_{6}H_{11})_{3}Sn)_{2}O + H_{2}O

The condensation process is proposed to occur via an associative mechanism, involving the dimer. Support for this associative mechanism is the finding that Me3SnOH exists in solution as the dimer ((CH_{3})_{3}Sn)_{2}(μ-OH)_{2}.

== Reactivity ==
Indicative of the lability of the Sn-O bond, distannoxanes exchange with other distannoxanes:

(R_{3}Sn)_{2}O + (R'_{3}Sn)_{2}O → 2 R_{3}SnOSnR'_{3}

The Sn-O-Sn bonds in simple organic derivatives are reactive toward carboxylic acid esters to give unsymmetrical distannoxanes:

2 R_{2}SnO + R'CO_{2}R" → R'CO_{2}SnR_{2}−O−SnR_{2}OR"
