= Tributyltin hydride =

Skeletal formula of tributyltin with one explicit hydrogen added
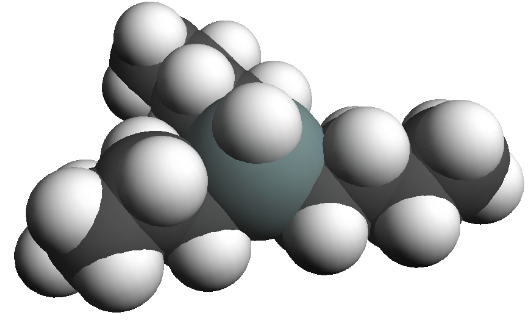
Spacefill model of tributyltin
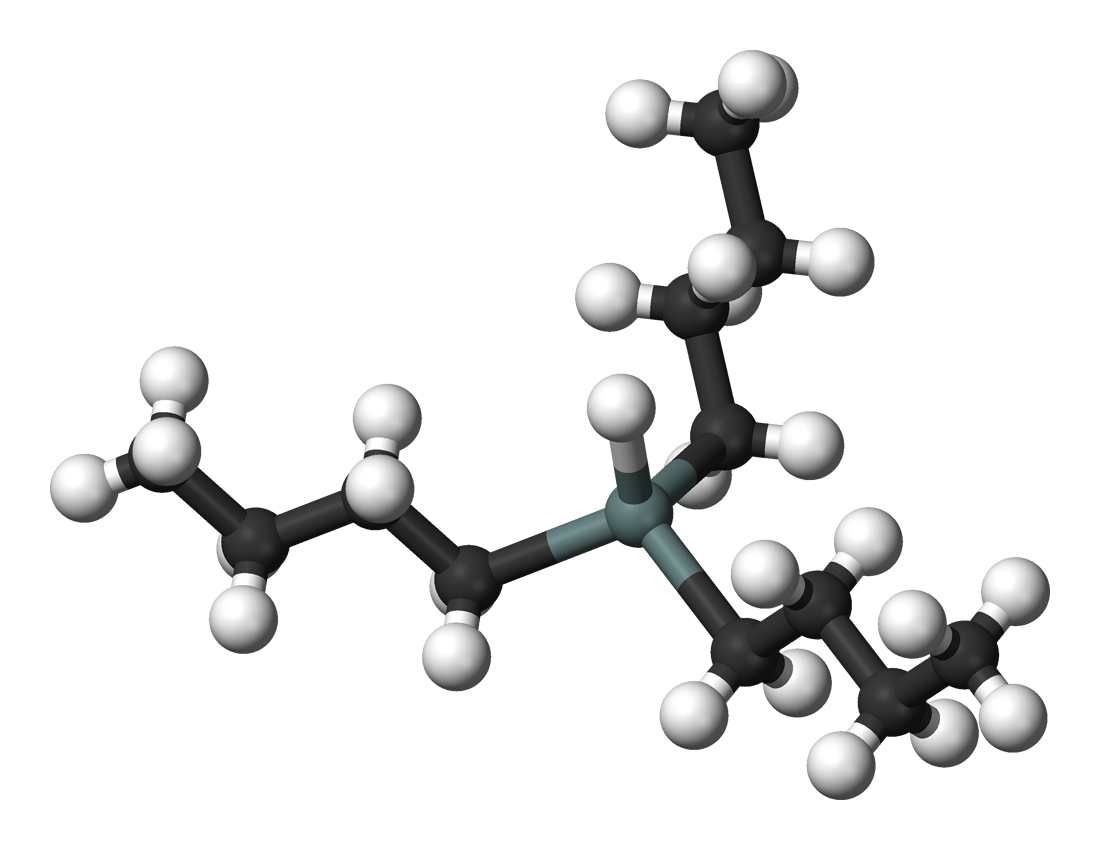
- Ball and stick model of tributyltin

Names
- Systematic IUPAC name Tributylstannane

Identifiers
CAS Number	688-73-3
3D model (JSmol)	Interactive image
Beilstein Reference	3587329
ChEBI	CHEBI:27086
ChemSpider	5734
ECHA InfoCard	100.010.642
EC Number	211-704-4
Gmelin Reference	4258
MeSH	Tributyltin
PubChem CID	5948
UNII	4XDX163P3D
CompTox Dashboard (EPA)	DTXSID0040709
- InChI: InChI=1S/3C4H9.Sn.H/c3*1-3-4-2;;/h3*1,3-4H2,2H3;; Key: DBGVGMSCBYYSLD-UHFFFAOYSA-N
- SMILES: CCCC[SnH](CCCC)CCCC

Properties
Chemical formula	SnC_{12}H_{28}
Molar mass	291.06 g mol^{−1}
Density	1.082 g cm^{−3}
Boiling point	80 °C (176 °F; 353 K) at 50 Pa
Solubility in water	Slowly reacts
- Except where otherwise noted, data are given for materials in their standard state (at 25 °C [77 °F], 100 kPa). verify (what is ?) Infobox references

Tributyltin hydride is an organotin compound with the formula (C_{4}H_{9})_{3}SnH. It is a colorless liquid that is soluble in organic solvents. The compound is used as a source of hydrogen atoms in organic synthesis.

== Synthesis and characterization ==
The compound is produced by reduction of tributyltin oxide with polymethylhydrosiloxane:

2 "[MeSi(H)O]_{n}" + (Bu_{3}Sn)_{2}O → "[MeSi(OH)O]_{n}" + 2 Bu_{3}SnH

It can also be synthesized by a reduction of tributyltin chloride with lithium aluminium hydride.

The hydride is a distillable liquid that is mildly sensitive to air, decomposing to (Bu_{3}Sn)_{2}O. Its IR spectrum exhibits a strong band at 1814 cm^{−1} for ν_{Sn−H}.

== Applications ==
It is a specialized reagent in organic synthesis. Combined with azobisisobutyronitrile (AIBN) or by irradiation with light, tributyltin hydride converts organic halides (and related groups) to the corresponding hydrocarbon. This process occurs via a radical chain mechanism involving the radical Bu_{3}Sn^{•}. The radical abstracts a H^{•} from another equivalent of tributyltin hydride, propagating the chain. Tributyltin hydride's utility as a H^{•} donor can be attributed to its relatively weak bond strength (78 kcal/mol).

It is the reagent of choice for hydrostannylation reactions:

RC_{2}R′ + HSnBu_{3} → RC(H)=C(SnBu_{3})R′

== See also ==
- Tributyltin
- Trimethylsilyl
