= Trophon nucelliformis =

Scientific classification
- Kingdom: Animalia
- Phylum: Mollusca
- Class: Gastropoda
- Subclass: Caenogastropoda
- Order: Neogastropoda
- Family: Muricidae
- Genus: Trophon
- Species: T. nucelliformis

Binomial name
- Trophon nucelliformis Oliver & Picken, 1984

Species of gastropod

Trophon nucelliformis is a species of sea snail, a marine gastropod mollusk in the family Muricidae, the murex snails or rock snails.

== Description ==
The shell can grow to be 22 mm in length.

== Distribution ==
Can be found off of South Shetland Islands and the South Orkney Islands.
