= Trophon pelecetus =

Scientific classification
- Kingdom: Animalia
- Phylum: Mollusca
- Class: Gastropoda
- Subclass: Caenogastropoda
- Order: Neogastropoda
- Family: Muricidae
- Genus: Trophon
- Species: T. pelecetus

Binomial name
- Trophon pelecetus Dall, 1902

Species of gastropod

Trophon pelecetus is a species of sea snail, a marine gastropod mollusk in the family Muricidae, the murex snails or rock snails.
