= Trophon clenchi =

Scientific classification
- Kingdom: Animalia
- Phylum: Mollusca
- Class: Gastropoda
- Subclass: Caenogastropoda
- Order: Neogastropoda
- Family: Muricidae
- Genus: Trophon
- Species: T. clenchi

Binomial name
- Trophon clenchi (Carcelles, 1953)

Synonyms
- Murex clenchi Carcelles, 1953

Species of gastropod

Trophon clenchi is a species of sea snail, a marine gastropod mollusk in the family Muricidae, the murex snails or rock snails.

== Distribution ==
It can be found off of Argentina and Uruguay.
