= Butyltin trichloride =

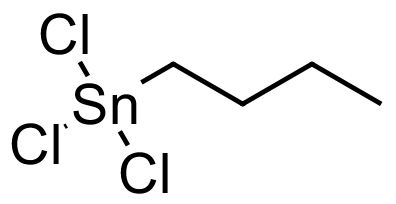

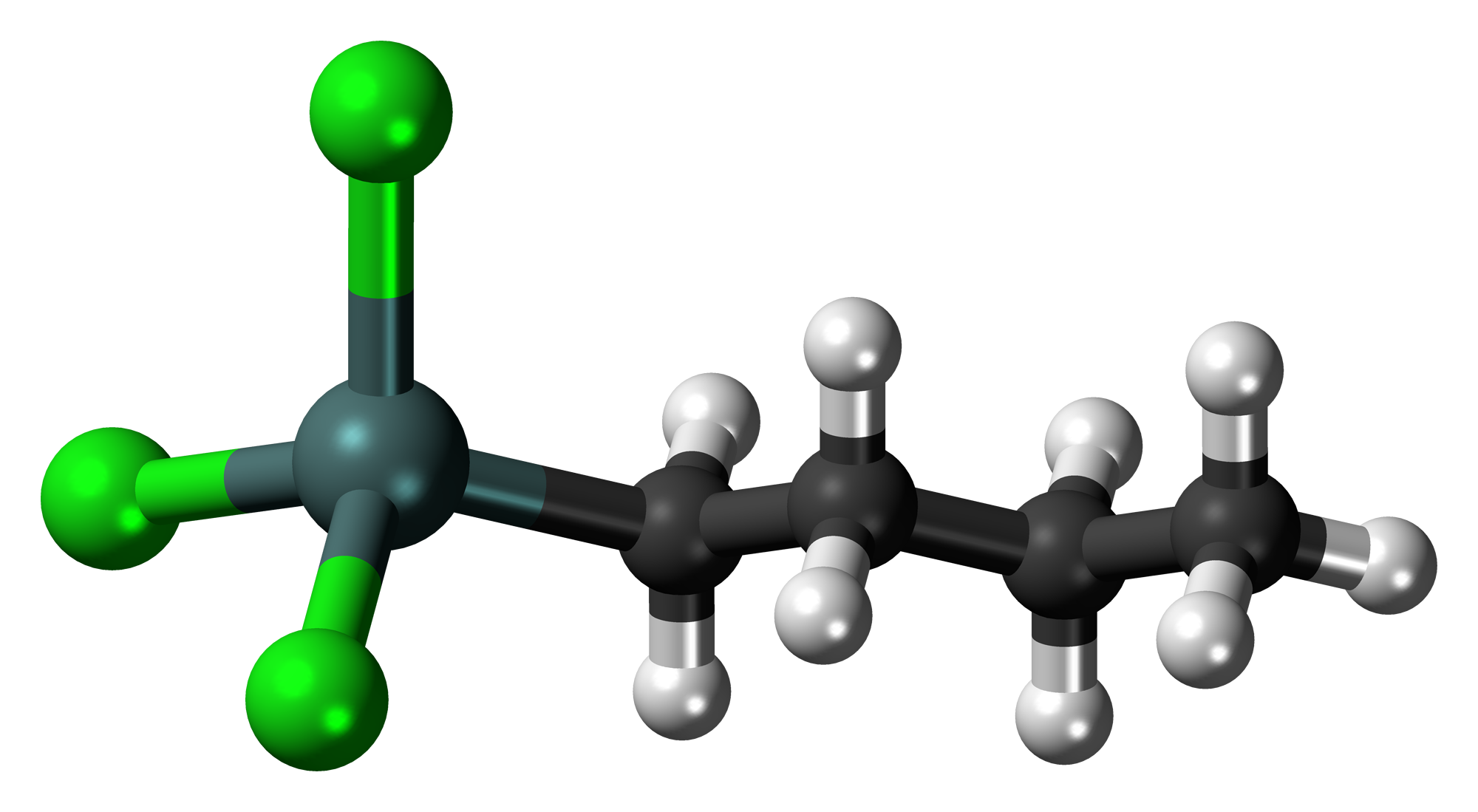

Names
- Preferred IUPAC name Butyltri(chloro)stannane

Identifiers
CAS Number	1118-46-3
3D model (JSmol)	Interactive image
Beilstein Reference	4-04-00-04346
ChemSpider	13600
ECHA InfoCard	100.012.967
EC Number	214-263-6
PubChem CID	14236
RTECS number	WH6780000
UNII	9R2DZM42GM
UN number	UN3265
CompTox Dashboard (EPA)	DTXSID0029210
- InChI: InChI=1S/C4H9.3ClH.Sn/c1-3-4-2;;;;/h1,3-4H2,2H3;3*1H;/q;;;;+3/p-3
- SMILES: Cl[Sn](Cl)(Cl)CCCC

Properties
Chemical formula	C_{4}H_{9}SnCl_{3}
Molar mass	282.18
Appearance	Clear liquid
Density	1.693 g/cm^{3}
Melting point	−63 °C (−81 °F; 210 K)
Boiling point	93 °C (199 °F; 366 K) at 10 mmHg (lit.)
Solubility	Soluble in most common organic solvents
Vapor pressure	0.077 mm Hg at 25°C

Hazards
- Occupational safety and health (OHS/OSH)
Main hazards	Combustible liquid, Harmful by ingestion, Harmful by skin absorption, Corrosive
NFPA 704 (fire diamond)	3 2 0
Flash point	81 °C (178 °F; 354 K)
- Lethal dose or concentration (LD, LC)
LD_{50} (median dose)	2140 mg/kg (Oral rat)
- Safety data sheet (SDS)
- Except where otherwise noted, data are given for materials in their standard state (at 25 °C [77 °F], 100 kPa). verify (what is ?) Infobox references

Monobutyltin trichloride, also known as MBTC, is an organotin compound. It is a colorless oil that is soluble in organic solvents. Relative to other organotin compounds, MBTC is obscure and not widely used.

== Applications ==
=== Glass coating ===
Monobutyltin trichloride has been examined as a precursor to tin dioxide coatings on glass. Such coatings, especially when doped, are low-emissivity and transparent to visible light, reflect infrared light, and provide a high conductance and a low sheet resistance.

For example, MBTC is used in the manufacturing process of glass containers such as those used for beers, spirits, and juices. These glass-making processes heat raw materials (sand, soda-ash, limestone, and recycled glass) to produce molten glass. The molten glob is cut into smaller pieces of uniform size, and are then pressed in a mold. MBTC is applied on the external surface of these containers, and then, the glass is annealed and coated with polyethylene.

MBTC is a commonly used organotin compound for on-line chemical vapor deposition because it readily decomposes at or close to the hot glass surface. The tin dioxide coatings formed are transparent to visible light, reflect infrared light, and are highly conductive. If these coatings are doped with fluorine from a source like trifluoroacetic acid (TFA), the coating will also have a lowered emissivity.

=== PVC stabilizer ===
Monobutyltin trichloride is used as a polyvinyl chloride (PVC) stabilizer. PVC is used in mass production for various objects. One such object is a PVC based container for various wines and brandies (especially those produced in Canada). Consequently, the MBTC leaches into the wine along with other organotin compounds (some of which are used as wood preservatives for the wine barrels). These compounds are toxic to the human body, and the amount of organotin compounds, especially MBTC, have been the subject of a lot of food-safety based research.

Another object PVC is used in is pipe production. Since these pipes are used to carry drinking water, the MBTC is leaching into the drinking water supply.

== Safety ==
Monobutyltin trichloride releases corrosive hydrogen chloride upon hydrolysis. Unlike some organotin compounds, it has relatively low toxicity.

== See also ==
- chemical vapor deposition
- physical vapor deposition
- tetramethyltin
