= Trophon albolabratus =

Scientific classification
- Kingdom: Animalia
- Phylum: Mollusca
- Class: Gastropoda
- Subclass: Caenogastropoda
- Order: Neogastropoda
- Family: Muricidae
- Genus: Trophon
- Species: T. albolabratus

Binomial name
- Trophon albolabratus E.A. Smith, 1875

Synonyms
- Trophon cinguliferus Pfeffer, in Martens & Pfeffer, 1886

Species of gastropod

Trophon albolabratus is a species of sea snail, a marine gastropod mollusk in the family Muricidae, the murex snails or rock snails.

== Description ==
The shell can grow to be 40mm in length.

The shell of the holotype measures 40 mm in length and 18 mm in diameter, while the aperture is 24 mm long and 11 mm wide.

(original description in Latin) The shell is ovate-fusiform and turreted in shape, and is entirely white. It consists of six whorls, the first two of which form a smooth nucleus. The remaining whorls are convex and encircled by equal, subequidistant spiral ridges, with four to five on the upper whorls and about thirteen on the final one. These whorls are further adorned with numerous, somewhat crowded, and prominent foliaceous lamellae.

The aperture is oval at the top and prolongs into a siphonal canal below; its interior is a deep brown color, and its length equals about half the total length of the shell. The outer lip is slightly expanded and features a rather wide, white border inside. In the middle, the columella is slightly arched, becoming oblique at the base. It is covered in a bluish-white callus that is somewhat thick below and thin above where it joins the outer lip, and its inner margin is brown.

The umbilical region is slightly fissured, and the canal is narrow, oblique, a little recurved, and moderately elongated.

The operculum is yellowish-horn in color.

The shallow-water Trophon albolabratus features rounded whorls and is sculptured with crisp spiral cords, five of which run along the spire-whorls. The entire surface is overridden by very numerous axial lamellae—ranging from forty to fifty on the body whorl — creating an imbricated pattern where the cords and lamellae intersect.

== Distribution ==
It can be found off of New Zealand, the Kerguelen Islands, and the South Georgia Islands.
