= Trophon purdyae =

Scientific classification
- Kingdom: Animalia
- Phylum: Mollusca
- Class: Gastropoda
- Subclass: Caenogastropoda
- Order: Neogastropoda
- Family: Muricidae
- Genus: Trophon
- Species: T. purdyae

Binomial name
- Trophon purdyae Houart, 1983

Species of gastropod

Trophon purdyae is a species of sea snail, a marine gastropod mollusk in the family Muricidae, the murex snails or rock snails.
