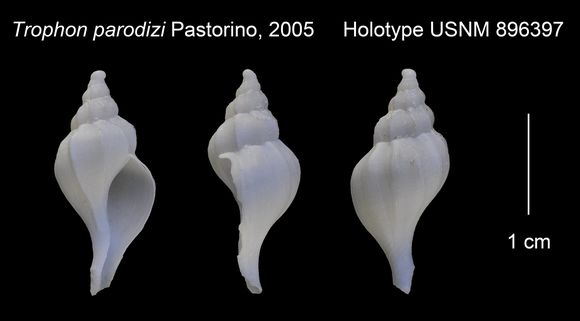

Scientific classification
- Kingdom: Animalia
- Phylum: Mollusca
- Class: Gastropoda
- Subclass: Caenogastropoda
- Order: Neogastropoda
- Family: Muricidae
- Genus: Trophon
- Species: T. parodizi

Binomial name
- Trophon parodizi Pastorino, 2005

= Trophon parodizi =

Species of gastropod

Trophon parodizi is a species of sea snail, a marine gastropod mollusk in the family Muricidae, the murex snails or rock snails.

== Distribution ==
Can be found off of the southern coasts of South America.
