= Trophon distantelamellatus =

Scientific classification
- Kingdom: Animalia
- Phylum: Mollusca
- Class: Gastropoda
- Subclass: Caenogastropoda
- Order: Neogastropoda
- Family: Muricidae
- Genus: Trophon
- Species: T. distantelamellatus

Binomial name
- Trophon distantelamellatus Strebel, 1908

Species of gastropod

Trophon distantelamellatus is a species of sea snail, a marine gastropod mollusk in the family Muricidae, the murex snails or rock snails.
