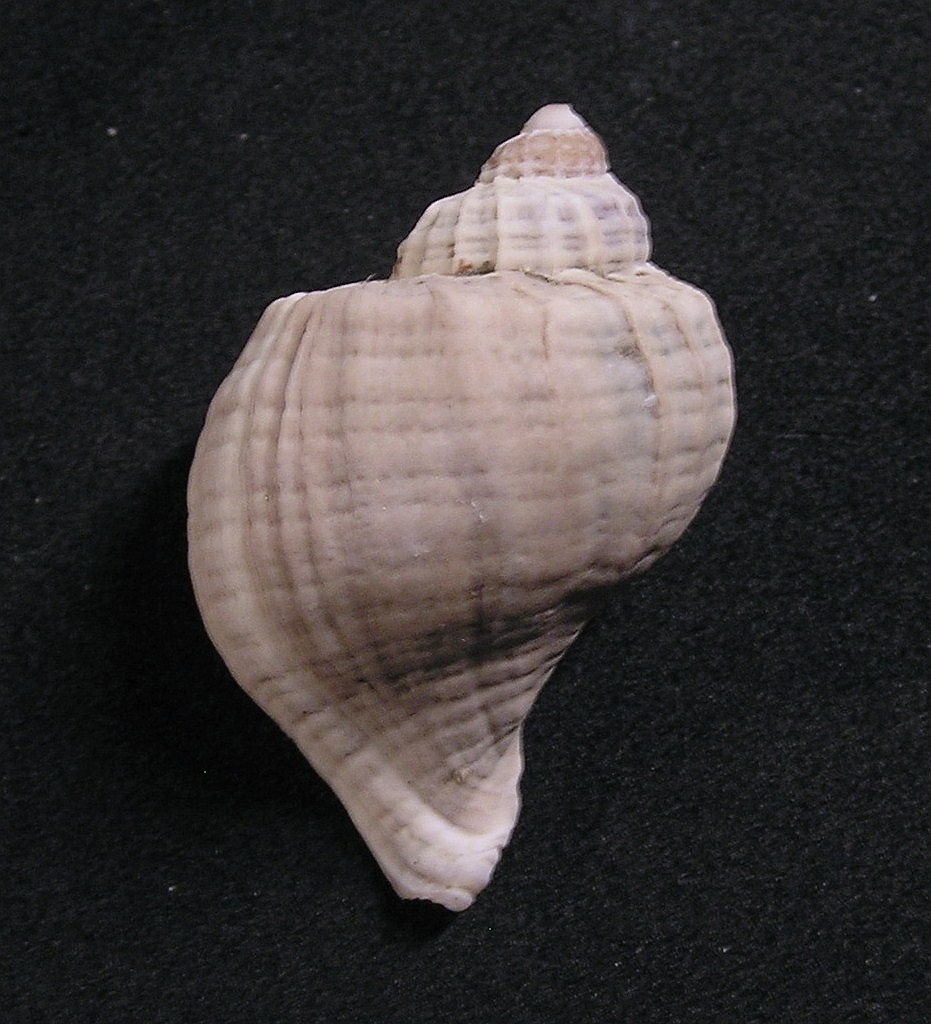
- Trophon geversianus acordonada

Scientific classification
- Kingdom: Animalia
- Phylum: Mollusca
- Class: Gastropoda
- Subclass: Caenogastropoda
- Order: Neogastropoda
- Family: Muricidae
- Subfamily: Trophoninae
- Genus: Trophon; Montfort, 1810

Synonyms
- † Caelobassus Stilwell & Zinsmeister, 1992 junior subjective synonym; Fusus (Trophon) Montfort, 1810; Murex (Muricidea) Swainson, 1840; Murex (Trophon) Montfort, 1810 ·; Muricidea Swainson, 1840; Polyplex Perry, 1810; Stramonitrophon Powell,1951; Trophon (Stramonitrophon) Powell, 1951; Trophon (Trophon) Montfort, 1810

= Trophon =

Genus of gastropods

Trophon is a genus of predatory sea snails, marine gastropod mollusks in the family Muricidae, the murex snails or rock snails.

== Species ==
The following species are recognised in the genus Trophon:

- Trophon albolabratus E. A. Smith, 1875
- Trophon bahamondei J. H. McLean & Andrade, 1982
- Trophon barnardi Houart, 1987
- † Trophon camachoi M. Griffin & Pastorino, 2005
- Trophon beatum Barnard, 1969
- Trophon brevispira E. von Martens, 1885
- Trophon celebensis Schepman, 1913
- Trophon clenchi (Carcelles, 1953)
- † Trophon contortus Brunet, 1997
- Trophon coulmanensis E. A. Smith, 1907
- † Trophon covacevichi Frassinetti, 2000
- † Trophon disparoides Wilckens, 1910
- Trophon distantelamellatus Strebel, 1908
- Trophon drygalskii Thiele, 1912
- † Trophon enemtensis A. Ilyina, 1979
- Trophon geversianus (Pallas, 1774)
- † Trophon halli Chapman & Crespin, 1928
- † Trophon hamiltonensis (Tate, 1888)
- † Trophon huilliche Frassinetti, 2000
- Trophon iarae Houart, 1998
- † Trophon inornatus Pilsbry, 1897
- † Trophon leanzai Brunet, 1997
- Trophon leptocharteres P. G. Oliver & Picken, 1984
- † Trophon macharei DeVries, 2005
- Trophon mawsoni Powell, 1957
- Trophon melvillsmithi Houart, 1989
- Trophon minutus Melvill & Standen, 1907
- † Trophon munitus (Marwick, 1934)
- Trophon nucelliformis P. G. Oliver & Picken, 1984
- Trophon ohlini Strebel, 1904
- † Trophon parcus Frassinetti, 2000
- Trophon parodizi Pastorino, 2005
- Trophon patagonicus (d'Orbigny, 1839)
- Trophon paucilamellatus Powell, 1951
- Trophon pelecetus Dall, 1902
- Trophon pelseneeri E. A. Smith, 1915
- Trophon plicatus ([Lightfoot], 1786)
- † Trophon profundus Chapman & Crespin, 1928
- Trophon purdyae Houart, 1983
- † Trophon radwini (Stilwell & Zinsmeister, 1992)
- † Trophon santacruzensis Ihering, 1897
- † Trophon sowerbyi M. Griffin & Pastorino, 2005
- † Trophon subclavatus Yokoyama, 1920
- Trophon triacanthus Castellanos, Rolán & Bartolotta, 1987
- † Trophon umzambiensis Kiel & Bandel, 2003
- † Trophon vetulus Frassinetti, 2000
- † Trophon vokesae Brunet, 1997
