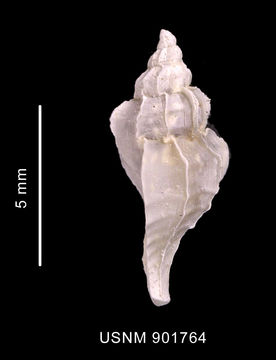

Scientific classification
- Kingdom: Animalia
- Phylum: Mollusca
- Class: Gastropoda
- Subclass: Caenogastropoda
- Order: Neogastropoda
- Family: Muricidae
- Genus: Trophon
- Species: T. ohlini

Binomial name
- Trophon ohlini Strebel, 1904

= Trophon ohlini =

Species of gastropod

Trophon ohlini is a species of sea snail, a marine gastropod mollusk in the family Muricidae, the murex snails or rock snails.

== Description ==
The shell can grow to be 12 mm to 15 mm in length.

== Distribution ==
It can be found in the southern Atlantic Ocean off of Argentina and the Falkland Islands.
