= Trophon brevispira =

Scientific classification
- Kingdom: Animalia
- Phylum: Mollusca
- Class: Gastropoda
- Subclass: Caenogastropoda
- Order: Neogastropoda
- Family: Muricidae
- Genus: Trophon
- Species: T. brevispira

Binomial name
- Trophon brevispira Martens, 1885

Species of gastropod

Trophon brevispira is a species of sea snail, a marine gastropod mollusk in the family Muricidae, the murex snails or rock snails.

== Description ==
The shell can grow to be 25 to 35 millimetres (0.98 to 1.38 in).

== Distribution ==
It can be found off of the South Georgia Islands and Antarctica.
