= Trophon triacanthus =

Scientific classification
- Kingdom: Animalia
- Phylum: Mollusca
- Class: Gastropoda
- Subclass: Caenogastropoda
- Order: Neogastropoda
- Family: Muricidae
- Genus: Trophon
- Species: T. triacanthus

Binomial name
- Trophon triacanthus Castellanos, Rolan & Bartolotto, 1987

Species of gastropod

Trophon triacanthus is a species of sea snail, a marine gastropod mollusk in the family Muricidae, the murex snails or rock snails.
