= Hydrostannylation =

In chemistry, hydrostannylation is the insertion of unsaturated substrates into an Sn-H bond. The reaction occurs under free-radical conditions, but the stereochemistry and regiochemistry are often complex. The reaction gained synthetic importance with the discovery that palladium complexes catalyze the reaction. The reaction is analogous to hydrosilylation and is a subset of hydroelementation. Hydrostannylation is a versatile route to organotin compounds, many of which are versatile synthetic intermediates, e.g. in Stille coupling.

== Substrates and scope ==
The typical Pd-based catalyst is tetrakis(triphenylphosphine)palladium(0). The typical unsaturated substrates are alkynes. The typical stannane is tributyltin hydride. The reaction mechanism is assumed to operate via oxidative addition of the stannane to give a stannyl palladium hydride.

RC_{2}R' + HSnBu_{3} → RC(H)=C(SnBu_{3})R'

Often, an excess of the hydride reagent is required since some is consumed through competing dehydrocoupling reactions:

2 HSnBu_{3} → Bu_{3}Sn-SnBu_{3} → H_{2}
