= Trophon celebensis =

Scientific classification
- Kingdom: Animalia
- Phylum: Mollusca
- Class: Gastropoda
- Subclass: Caenogastropoda
- Order: Neogastropoda
- Superfamily: Muricoidea
- Family: Muricidae
- Subfamily: Trophoninae
- Genus: Trophon
- Species: T. celebensis

Binomial name
- Trophon celebensis Schepman, 1913

Species of gastropod

Trophon celebensis is a species of sea snail, a marine gastropod mollusk, in the family Muricidae, the murex snails or rock snails. Trophon celebensis reproduce through sexual reproduction, unlike some other snails which do so through asexual reproduction.

== Distribution ==
Can be found off of the Indonesian island of Sulawesi.
