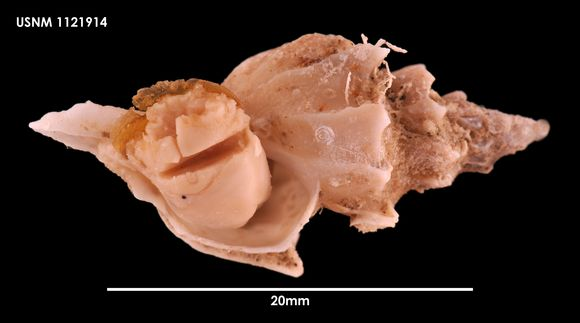

Scientific classification
- Kingdom: Animalia
- Phylum: Mollusca
- Class: Gastropoda
- Subclass: Caenogastropoda
- Order: Neogastropoda
- Family: Muricidae
- Genus: Trophon
- Species: T. coulmanensis

Binomial name
- Trophon coulmanensis E.A. Smith, 1907

Synonyms
- Trophon multilamellatus Numanami, 1996

= Trophon coulmanensis =

Species of gastropod

Trophon coulmanensis is a species of sea snail, a marine gastropod mollusk in the family Muricidae, the murex snails or rock snails.

== Description ==
The shell can grow to be 13 mm (0.51 in) to 23 mm (0.91 in) in length.

== Distribution ==
It can be found in the South Shetland Islands.
