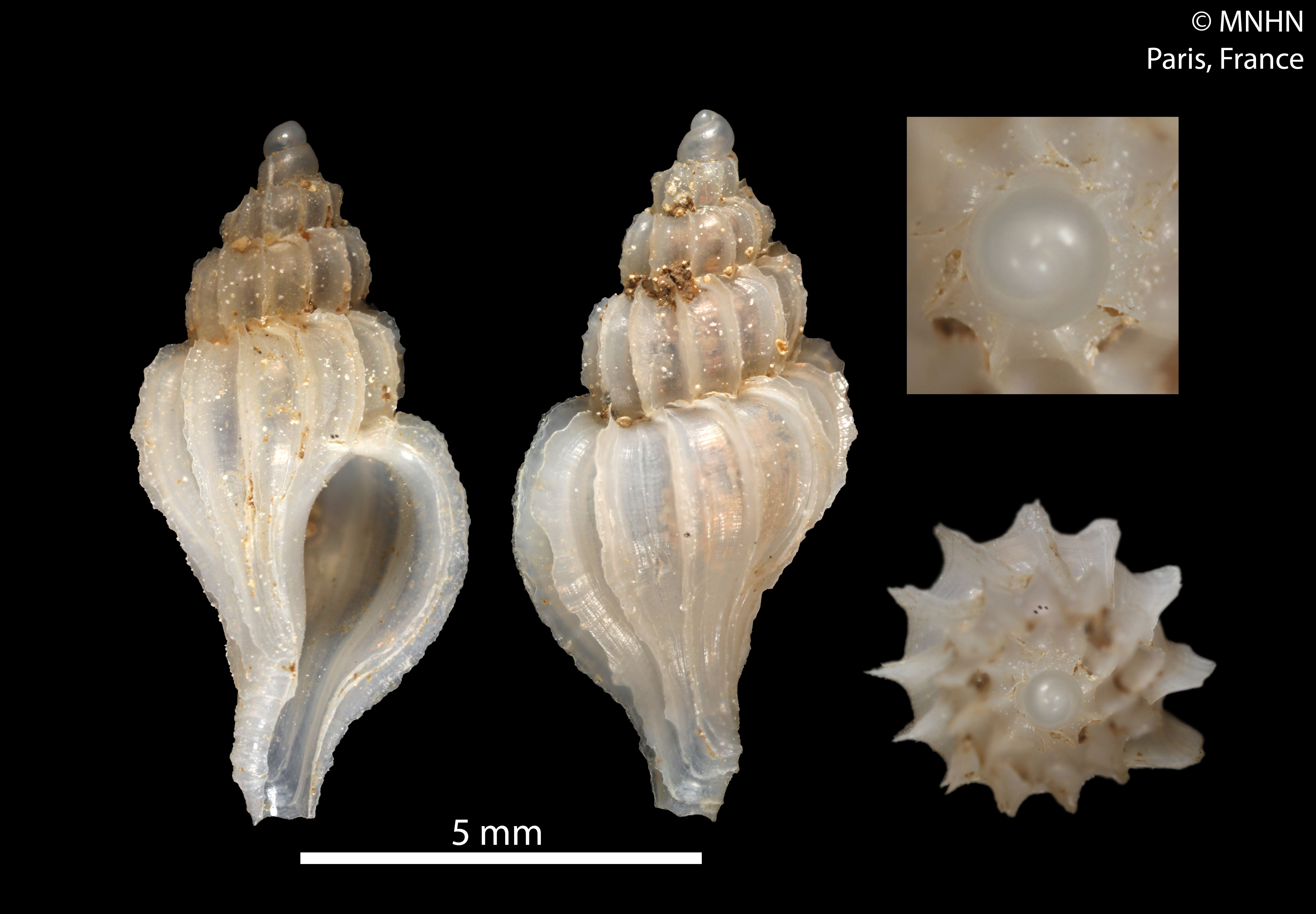
- Shell of Trophon barnardi (paratype at MNHN, Paris)

Scientific classification
- Kingdom: Animalia
- Phylum: Mollusca
- Class: Gastropoda
- Subclass: Caenogastropoda
- Order: Neogastropoda
- Family: Muricidae
- Subfamily: Trophoninae
- Genus: Trophon
- Species: T. barnardi

Binomial name
- Trophon barnardi Houart, 1987

= Trophon barnardi =

Species of gastropod

Trophon barnardi is a species of sea snail, a marine gastropod mollusk in the family Muricidae, the murex snails or rock snails.

== Description ==
The shell can grow to be 10 mm.

== Distribution ==
The geographic distribution includes South Africa and the Indian Ocean.
