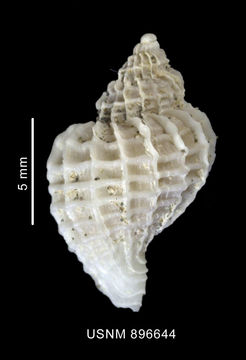

Scientific classification
- Kingdom: Animalia
- Phylum: Mollusca
- Class: Gastropoda
- Subclass: Caenogastropoda
- Order: Neogastropoda
- Family: Muricidae
- Genus: Trophon
- Species: T. mawsoni

Binomial name
- Trophon mawsoni Powell, 1957

= Trophon mawsoni =

Species of gastropod

Trophon mawsoni is a species of sea snail, a marine gastropod mollusk in the family Muricidae, the murex snails or rock snails.

== Distribution ==
It can be found off of New Zealand, mainly off of Ninety Mile Beach and North Island.
