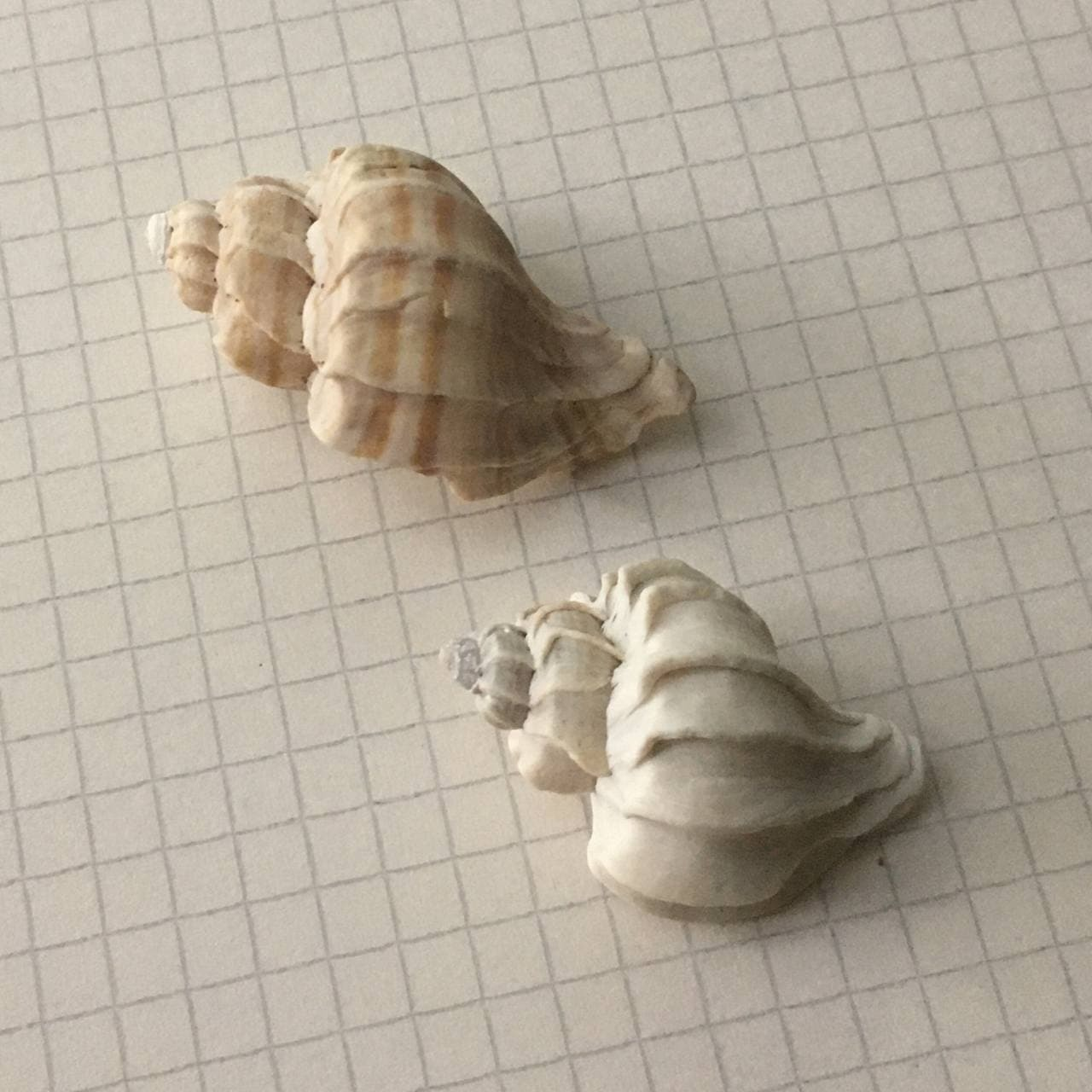

Scientific classification
- Kingdom: Animalia
- Phylum: Mollusca
- Class: Gastropoda
- Subclass: Caenogastropoda
- Order: Neogastropoda
- Family: Muricidae
- Genus: Trophon
- Species: T. patagonicus

Binomial name
- Trophon patagonicus (d'Orbigny, 1839)

Synonyms
- Murex patagonicus d'Orbigny, 1841; Trophon necocheanum Ihering, 1907

= Trophon patagonicus =

Species of gastropod

Trophon patagonicus is a species of sea snail, a marine gastropod mollusk in the family Muricidae, the murex snails or rock snails.

== Description ==
The shell can grow to be 30 mm to 55 mm in length.

== Distribution ==
It can be found in the southern Atlantic Ocean off the coast of Argentina.
