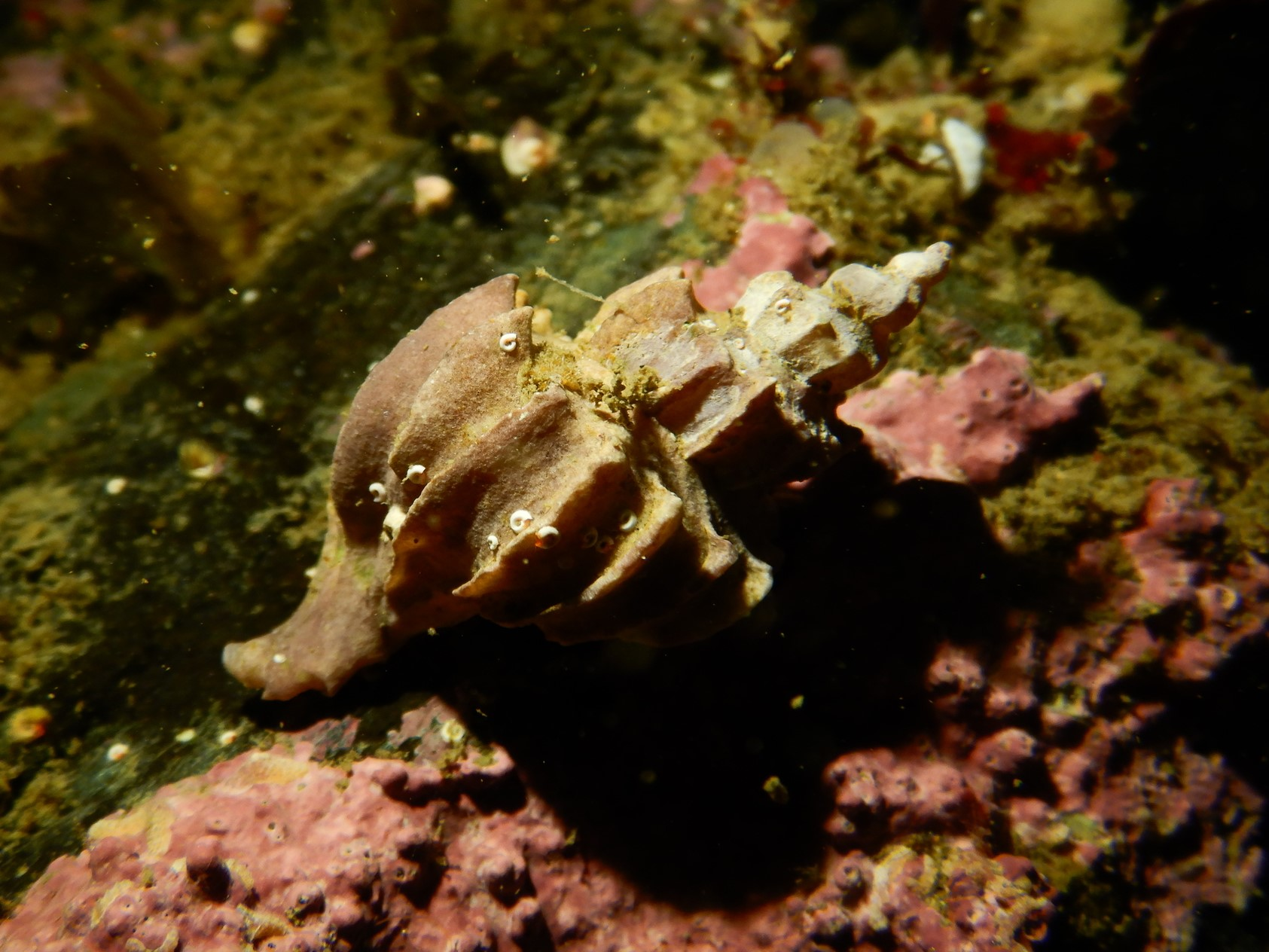

Scientific classification
- Kingdom: Animalia
- Phylum: Mollusca
- Class: Gastropoda
- Subclass: Caenogastropoda
- Order: Neogastropoda
- Family: Muricidae
- Genus: Trophon
- Species: T. plicatus

Binomial name
- Trophon plicatus (Lightfoot, 1786)

Synonyms
- List: Buccinum laciniatus sensu Martyn Dillwyn, 1817; Murex lamellosus Gmelin, 1791; Murex plicatus Lightfoot, 1786; Polyplex gracilis Perry, 1811; Trophon antarcticus Philippi, 1868

= Trophon plicatus =

Species of gastropod

Trophon plicatus is a species of sea snail, a marine gastropod mollusk in the family Muricidae, the murex snails or rock snails.
