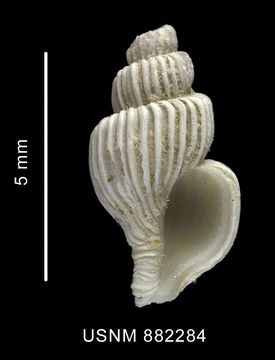

Scientific classification
- Kingdom: Animalia
- Phylum: Mollusca
- Class: Gastropoda
- Subclass: Caenogastropoda
- Order: Neogastropoda
- Family: Muricidae
- Genus: Trophon
- Species: T. minutus

Binomial name
- Trophon minutus Strebel, 1907

Synonyms
- Trophon condensatus Hedley, 1916

= Trophon minutus =

Species of gastropod

Trophon minutus is a species of sea snail, a marine gastropod mollusk in the family Muricidae, the murex snails or rock snails.

== Description ==
The shell can grow to be 7.3 mm in length.

== Distribution ==
It can be found off of the South Georgia Islands, South Sandwich Islands, South Shetland Islands, Antarctic Peninsula, and Antarctica.
