= Trophon bahamondei =

Scientific classification
- Kingdom: Animalia
- Phylum: Mollusca
- Class: Gastropoda
- Subclass: Caenogastropoda
- Order: Neogastropoda
- Family: Muricidae
- Genus: Trophon
- Species: T. bahamondei

Binomial name
- Trophon bahamondei McLean & Andrade, 1982

Species of gastropod

Trophon bahamondei is a species of sea snail, a marine gastropod mollusk in the family Muricidae, the murex snails or rock snails.

== Description ==
The shell can grow to be 35mm to 50mm in length.

== Distribution ==
It can be found in Chile, mostly off of Quintero.
