= Trophon pelseneeri =

Scientific classification
- Kingdom: Animalia
- Phylum: Mollusca
- Class: Gastropoda
- Subclass: Caenogastropoda
- Order: Neogastropoda
- Family: Muricidae
- Genus: Trophon
- Species: T. pelseneeri

Binomial name
- Trophon pelseneeri E.A. Smith, 1915

Synonyms
- Trophon d'Orbignyi Carcelles, 1946

Species of gastropod

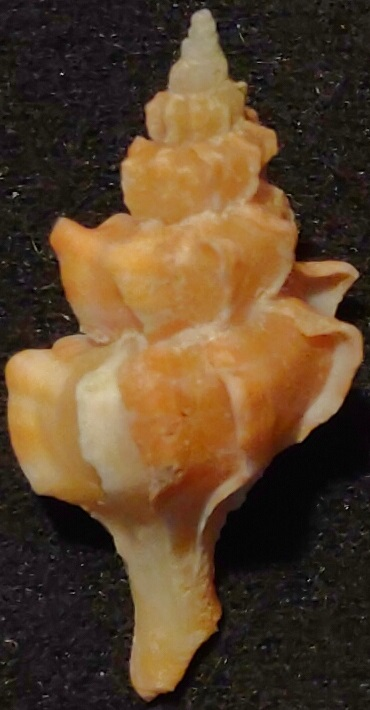

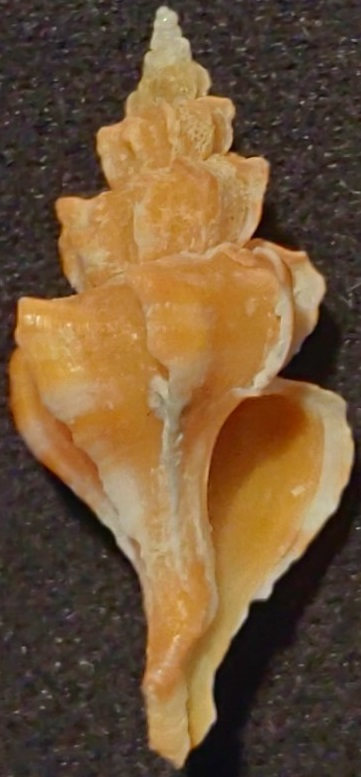

Trophon pelseneeri is a species of sea snail, a marine gastropod mollusk in the family Muricidae, the murex snails or rock snails.

== Description ==
Shell size 30–35 mm.

== Distribution ==
Trawled at 60–80 metres depth, off Rio de Janeiro, Brazil.
