= Trophon iarae =

Scientific classification
- Kingdom: Animalia
- Phylum: Mollusca
- Class: Gastropoda
- Subclass: Caenogastropoda
- Order: Neogastropoda
- Family: Muricidae
- Genus: Trophon
- Species: T. iarae

Binomial name
- Trophon iarae Houart, 1998

Species of gastropod

Trophon iarae is a species of sea snail, a marine gastropod mollusk in the family Muricidae, the murex snails or rock snails.

== Description ==
The shell can grow to be 75 mm (3.0 in) in length.

== Distribution ==
It can be found off of southern Brazil, Uruguay, and the Falkland Islands.
