= Trophon melvillsmithi =

Scientific classification
- Kingdom: Animalia
- Phylum: Mollusca
- Class: Gastropoda
- Subclass: Caenogastropoda
- Order: Neogastropoda
- Family: Muricidae
- Genus: Trophon
- Species: T. melvillsmithi

Binomial name
- Trophon melvillsmithi Houart, 1989

Species of gastropod

Trophon melvillsmithi is a species of sea snail, a marine gastropod mollusk in the family Muricidae, the murex snails or rock snails.

== Description ==
The shell can grow to be 7 mm in length.

== Distribution ==
It can be found off of Namibia.
