= Tributyltin chloride =

Names
- Preferred IUPAC name Chlorotri(butyl)stannane
- Other names Tributylchlorotin; TBTC

Identifiers
CAS Number	1461-22-9
3D model (JSmol)	Interactive image
ChEBI	CHEBI:79734
ChemSpider	14368
ECHA InfoCard	100.014.508
EC Number	215-958-7
KEGG	C15224
PubChem CID	15096
UNII	CA82T4QR5F
CompTox Dashboard (EPA)	DTXSID3027403
- InChI: InChI=1S/3C4H9.ClH.Sn/c3*1-3-4-2;;/h3*1,3-4H2,2H3;1H;/q;;;;+1/p-1 Key: GCTFWCDSFPMHHS-UHFFFAOYSA-M
- SMILES: CCCC[Sn](CCCC)(CCCC)Cl

Properties
Chemical formula	C_{12}H_{27}ClSn
Molar mass	325.51 g·mol^{−1}
Appearance	colorless viscous liquid
Density	1.20 g·cm^{−3} (20 °C
Melting point	−9 °C (16 °F; 264 K)
Boiling point	171 °C (340 °F; 444 K)
Refractive index (n_{D})	1.4903

Hazards
- GHS labelling
Pictograms	(GHS06: Toxic) (GHS08: Health hazard) (GHS09: Environmental hazard)
Signal word	Danger
Hazard statements	H301, H312, H315, H317, H319, H360FD, H372, H410
Precautionary statements	P201, P273, P280, P301+P310+P330, P302+P352+P312, P305+P351+P338
Flash point	108 °C (226 °F; 381 K) (closed cup)
Safety data sheet (SDS)	External MSDS
- Except where otherwise noted, data are given for materials in their standard state (at 25 °C [77 °F], 100 kPa). Infobox references

Tributyltin chloride is an organotin compound with the formula (C_{4}H_{9})_{3}SnCl. It is a colorless liquid that is soluble in organic solvents.

== Preparation and reactions ==
The compound is prepared by a redistribution reaction by combining stannic chloride and tetrabutyltin:

3 (C_{4}H_{9})_{4}Sn + SnCl_{4} → 4 (C_{4}H_{9})_{3}SnCl

Tributyltin chloride hydrolyzes to the oxide [(C_{4}H_{9})_{3}Sn]_{2}O

Tributyltin chloride is used as a precursor to other organotin compounds and reagents, such as tributyltin hydride.
