= Tributyltin oxide =

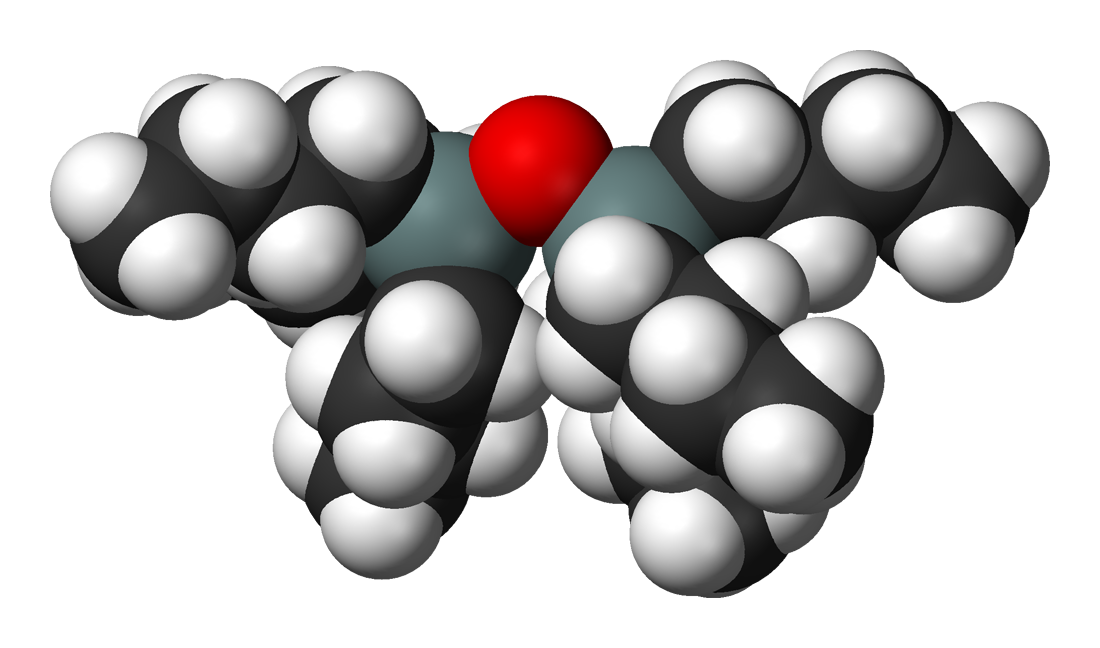

Names
- Preferred IUPAC name Hexabutyldistannoxane
- Other names Bis(tributyltin) oxide, tri-n-butyltin oxide, bis(tri-n-butyltin)oxide, AW 75-D, Bio-Met TBTO, Biomet, Biomet 75, BTO, Butinox, C-SN-9

Identifiers
CAS Number	56-35-9
3D model (JSmol)	Interactive image
ChEBI	CHEBI:81543
ChEMBL	ChEMBL511667
ChemSpider	10218152
ECHA InfoCard	100.000.244
EC Number	200-268-0
KEGG	C18149
PubChem CID	16682746
RTECS number	JN8750000
UNII	3353Q84MKM
UN number	2788 3020 2902
CompTox Dashboard (EPA)	DTXSID9020166
- InChI: InChI=1S/6C4H9.O.2Sn/c6*1-3-4-2;;;/h6*1,3-4H2,2H3;;; Key: APQHKWPGGHMYKJ-UHFFFAOYSA-N; InChI=1/6C4H9.O.2Sn/c6*1-3-4-2;;;/h6*1,3-4H2,2H3;;;/rC24H54OSn2/c1-7-13-19-26(20-14-8-2,21-15-9-3)25-27(22-16-10-4,23-17-11-5)24-18-12-6/h7-24H2,1-6H3 Key: APQHKWPGGHMYKJ-XAMPVVILAF
- SMILES: CCCC[Sn](CCCC)(CCCC)O[Sn](CCCC)(CCCC)CCCC

Properties
Chemical formula	C_{24}H_{54}OSn_{2}
Molar mass	596.112
Appearance	colorless oil
Density	1.17 g/mL at 25 °C (lit.)
Melting point	−45 °C (−49 °F; 228 K)
Boiling point	180 °C (356 °F; 453 K) at 2 mm Hg
Solubility in water	20 mg/L
Solubility	Hydrocarbons, alcohols, ethers, THF
log P	5.02

Hazards
- GHS labelling
Pictograms	(GHS06: Toxic) (GHS07: Exclamation mark) (GHS08: Health hazard) (GHS09: Environmental hazard)
Signal word	Danger
Hazard statements	H301, H312, H315, H319, H331, H372, H373, H410
Precautionary statements	P260, P264, P270, P271, P273, P280, P301+P310, P302+P352, P304+P340, P305+P351+P338, P311, P312, P314, P321, P322, P330, P332+P313, P337+P313, P362, P363, P391, P403+P233, P405, P501
- Except where otherwise noted, data are given for materials in their standard state (at 25 °C [77 °F], 100 kPa). verify (what is ?) Infobox references

Tributyltin oxide (TBTO) is an organotin compound chiefly used as a biocide (fungicide and molluscicide), especially a wood preservative. Its chemical formula is [(C_{4}H_{9})_{3}Sn]_{2}O. It is a colorless viscous liquid. It is poorly soluble in water (20 ppm) but highly soluble in organic solvents. It is a potent skin irritant.

Historically, tributyltin oxide's biggest application was as a marine anti-biofouling agent. Concerns over toxicity of these compounds have led to a worldwide ban by the International Maritime Organization. It is now considered a severe marine pollutant and a Substance of Very High Concern by the EU. Today, it is mainly used in wood preservation.
