= Redistribution (chemistry) =

Exchange of ligands and metalloid centers

In chemistry, redistribution usually refers to the exchange of anionic ligands bonded to metal and metalloid centers. The conversion does not involve redox, in contrast to disproportionation reactions. Some useful redistribution reactions are conducted at higher temperatures; upon cooling the mixture, the product mixture is kinetically frozen and the individual products can be separated. In cases where redistribution is rapid at mild temperatures, the reaction is less useful synthetically but still important mechanistically.

== Examples ==
Redistribution reactions are exhibited by methylboranes. Thus monomethyldiborane rapidly converts at room temperature to diborane and trimethylborane:

6 MeB_{2}H_{5} → 5 B_{2}H_{6} + 2 Me_{3}B

Useful redistribution reactions are found in organoaluminium, organoboron, and organosilicon chemistry.

BCl_{3} + 2 B(C_{2}H_{5})_{3} → 3 BCl(C_{2}H_{5})_{2}

In another example, tetramethylsilane is an undesirable product of the industrially important direct process, but it can be converted (recycled) into more useful products by redistribution with silicon tetrachloride:

SiMe_{4} + SiCl_{4} → 2 SiMe_{2}Cl_{2}

In organotin chemistry, the mixed alkyl tin chlorides are produced by redistribution, a reaction called the Kocheshkov comproportionation:

3 SnBu_{4} + SnCl_{4} → 4 SnBu_{3}Cl

Many metal halides undergo redistribution reactions, usually to afford nearly statistical mixtures of products. For example, titanium tetrachloride and titanium tetrabromide redistribute their halide ligands, one of many reactions in this conversion is shown:

TiCl_{4} + TiBr_{4} → 2 TiBr_{2}Cl_{2}
