= Organotin chemistry =

Branch of organic chemistry

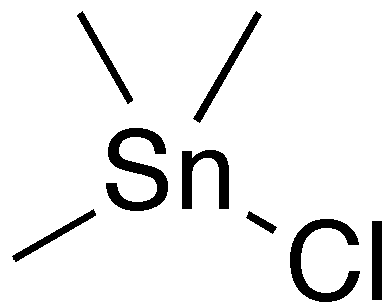
Organotin compounds are those with tin linked to hydrocarbons. The compound on the picture is trimethyltin chloride, an example of an organotin compound.

Organotin chemistry is the scientific study of the synthesis and properties of organotin compounds or stannanes, which are organometallic compounds containing tin–carbon bonds. The first organotin compound was diethyltin diiodide ((CH_{3}CH_{2})_{2}SnI_{2}), discovered by Edward Frankland in 1849. The area grew rapidly in the 1900s, especially after the discovery of the Grignard reagents, which are useful for producing Sn–C bonds. The area remains rich with many applications in industry and continuing activity in the research laboratory.

== Tn(IV) derivatives ==
The tetraorgano derivatives are invariably tetrahedral. Compounds of the type SnRR'R''R''' have been resolved into individual enantiomers.

Organotin compounds are classically prepared by alkylation of tin halides. Classic is the reaction of a Grignard reagent with tin halides for example tin tetrachloride. An example is provided by the synthesis of tetraethyltin:

4 CH_{3}CH_{2}MgBr + SnCl_{4} → (CH_{3}CH_{2})_{4}Sn + 4 MgClBr

The mixed organo-halo tin compounds can be converted to the mixed organic derivatives, as illustrated by the synthesis of dibutyldivinyltin:

Bu_{2}SnCl_{2} + 2 CH_{2}=CHMgBr → Bu_{2}Sn(CH=CH_{2})_{2} + 2 MgBrCl

The Wurtz-like coupling of alkyl sodium compounds with tin halides yields tetraorganotin compounds.

Hydrostannylation involves the metal-catalyzed addition of tin hydrides across unsaturated substrates.

Alternatively, stannides attack organic electrophiles to give organostannanes, e.g.:

LiSnMe_{3} + CCl_{4} → C(SnMe_{3})_{4} + LiCl.

=== Halides and cations ===
Organotin chlorides have the formula R_{4−n}SnCl_{n} for values of n up to 3. Bromides, iodides, and fluorides are also known, but are less important. These compounds are known for many R groups. They are almost always tetrahedral. The tri- and dihalides form adducts with good Lewis bases such as pyridine. The fluorides tend to associate such that dimethyltin difluoride forms sheet-like polymers. Di- and especially tri-organotin halides, e.g. tributyltin chloride, exhibit toxicities approaching that of hydrogen cyanide.

Tetraorganotin compoundscan then be converted to various mixed chlorides by redistribution reactions (also known as the "Kocheshkov comproportionation" in the case of organotin compounds):

3 R_{4}Sn + SnCl_{4} → 4 R_{3}SnCl
R_{4}Sn + SnCl_{4} → 2 R_{2}SnCl_{2}
R_{4}Sn + 3 SnCl_{4} → 4 RSnCl_{3}

A related method involves redistribution of tin halides with organoaluminium compounds.

In principle, alkyltin halides can be formed from direct insertion of the metal into the carbon-halogen bond. However, such reactions are temperamental, typically requiring a very weak carbon-halogen bond (e.g. an alkyl iodide or an allyl halide) or crown-complexed alkali metal salt catalyst. Lewis acids or an ionic solvent may also promote the reaction.

Triorganotin halides are electrophiles, implying a role for R_{3}Sn^{+}-like intermediates. Such cations are analogous to carbocations. They have been characterized crystallographically when the organic substituents are large, such as 2,4,6-triisopropylphenyl.

=== Hydrides ===
With tin being 0.2 units less electronegative than H, the tin hydride bond is described as slightly hydridic, i.e., Sn^{δ+}-H^{δ-}. Their relatively high reactivity reflects the weakness of the Sn-H bond, measured to be 74 kcal/mol.

Organotin(IV) hydrides have the formula R_{4−n}SnH_{n} for values of n up to 3. The parent member of this series, stannane (SnH_{4}), is an unstable colourless gas. Stability increases with the number of organic substituents. Tributyltin hydride is used as a source of hydride radical in some organic reactions.

The organotin hydrides are classically generated by reduction of the mixed alkyl chlorides. For example, treatment of dibutyltin dichloride with lithium aluminium hydride gives the dibutyltin dihydride, a colourless distillable oil:

2 Bu_{2}SnCl_{2} + Li[AlH_{4}] → 2 Bu_{2}SnH_{2} + Li[AlCl_{4}]

=== Oxides and hydroxides ===
Organotin oxides and hydroxides are common products from the hydrolysis of organotin halides. Unlike the corresponding derivatives of silicon and germanium, tin oxides and hydroxides often adopt structures with penta- and even hexacoordinated tin centres, especially for the diorgano- and monoorgano derivatives. The group Sn^{IV}−O−Sn^{IV} is called a stannoxane (which is a tin analogue of ethers), and the group Sn^{IV}−O−H is also called a stannanol (which is a tin analogue of alcohols). Structurally simplest of the oxides and hydroxides are the triorganotin derivatives. A commercially important triorganotin hydroxide is the acaricide cyhexatin (also called Plictran, tricyclohexyltin hydroxide and tricyclohexylstannanol), (C_{6}H_{11})_{3}SnOH. Such triorganotin hydroxides exist in equilibrium with the distannoxanes:

2 R_{3}SnOH ⇌ R_{3}SnOSnR_{3} + H_{2}O

With only two organic substituents on each Sn centre, the diorganotin oxides and hydroxides are structurally more complex than the triorgano derivatives. The simple tin geminal diols (R_{2}Sn(OH)_{2}, the tin analogues of geminal diols R_{2}C(OH)_{2}) and monomeric stannanones (R_{2}Sn=O, the tin analogues of ketones R_{2}C=O) are unknown. Diorganotin oxides (R_{2}SnO) are polymers except when the organic substituents are very bulky, in which case cyclic trimers or, in the case where R is CH(Si(CH_{3})_{3})_{2} dimers, with Sn_{3}O_{3} and Sn_{2}O_{2} rings. The distannoxanes exist as dimers with the formula [R_{2}SnX]_{2}O_{2} wherein the X groups (e.g., chloride –Cl, hydroxide –OH, carboxylate RCO_{2}−) can be terminal or bridging (see Table). The hydrolysis of the monoorganotin trihalides has the potential to generate stannanoic acids, RSnO_{2}H. As for the diorganotin oxides/hydroxides, the monoorganotin species form structurally complex because of the occurrence of dehydration/hydration, aggregation. Illustrative is the hydrolysis of butyltin trichloride to give [(CH_{3}(CH_{2})_{3}Sn)_{12}O_{14}(OH)_{6}]^{2+}.

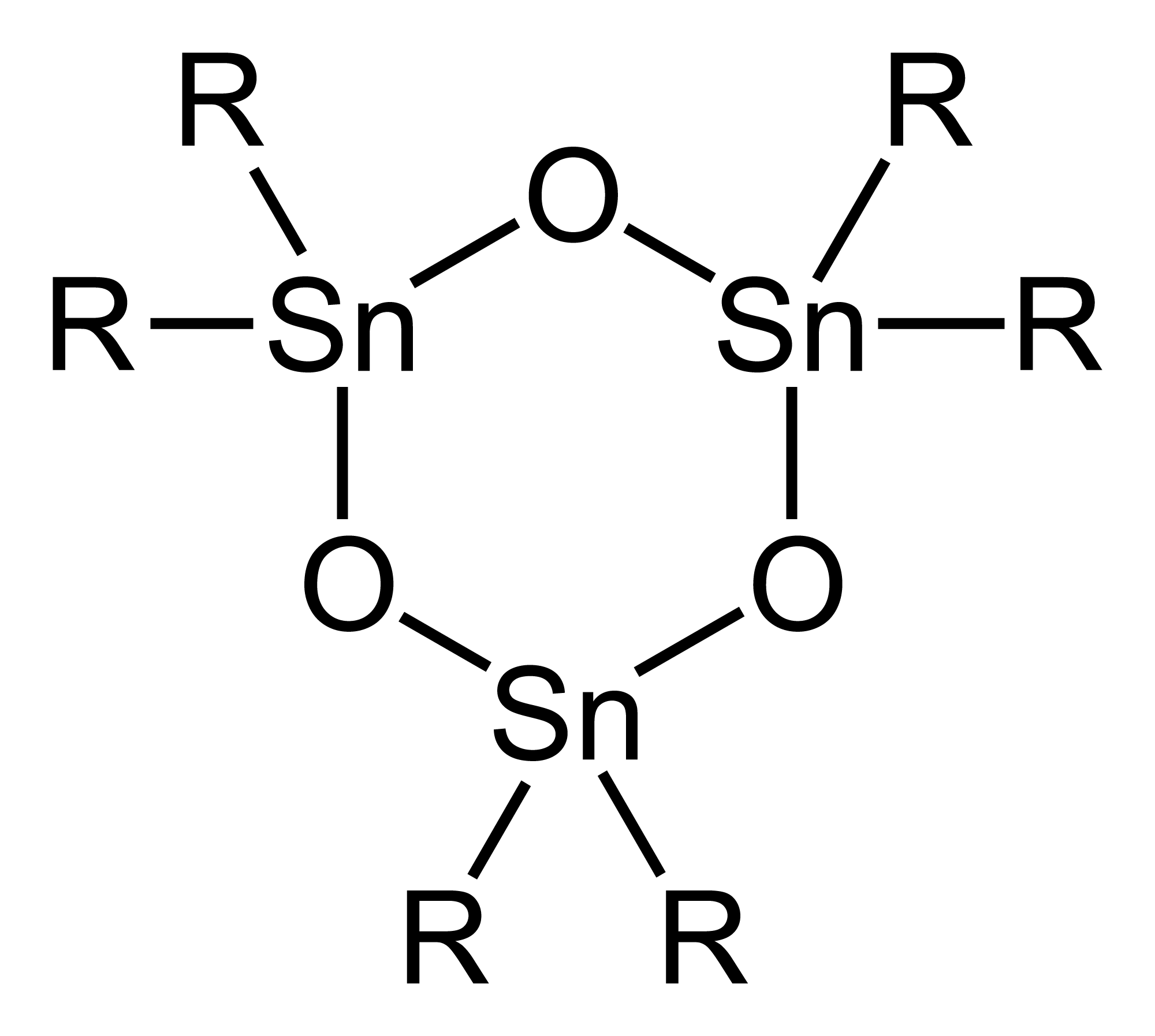
Idealized structure of trimeric diorganotin oxide.

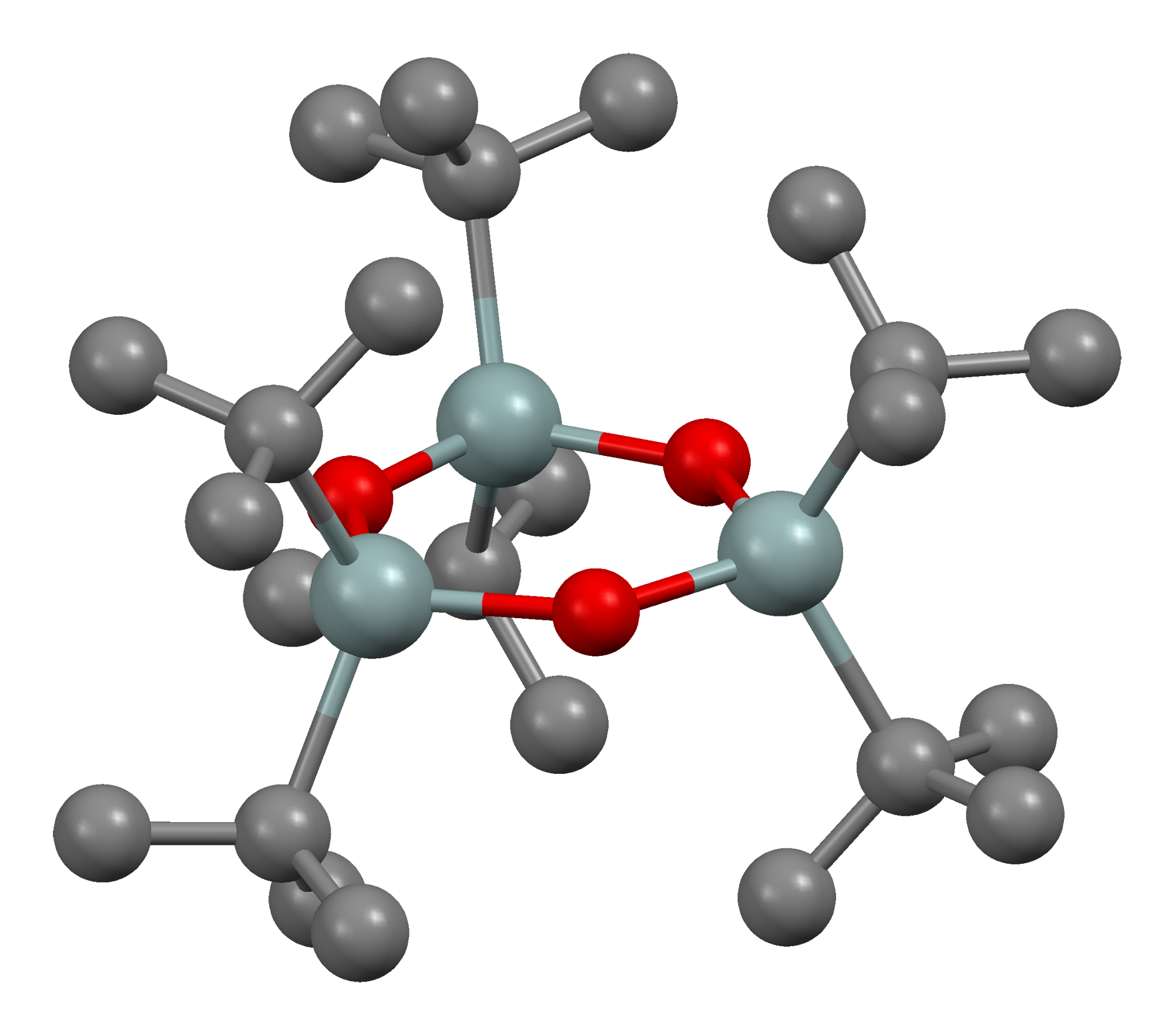
Ball-and-stick model for (((CH_{3})_{3}C)_{2}SnO)_{3}.

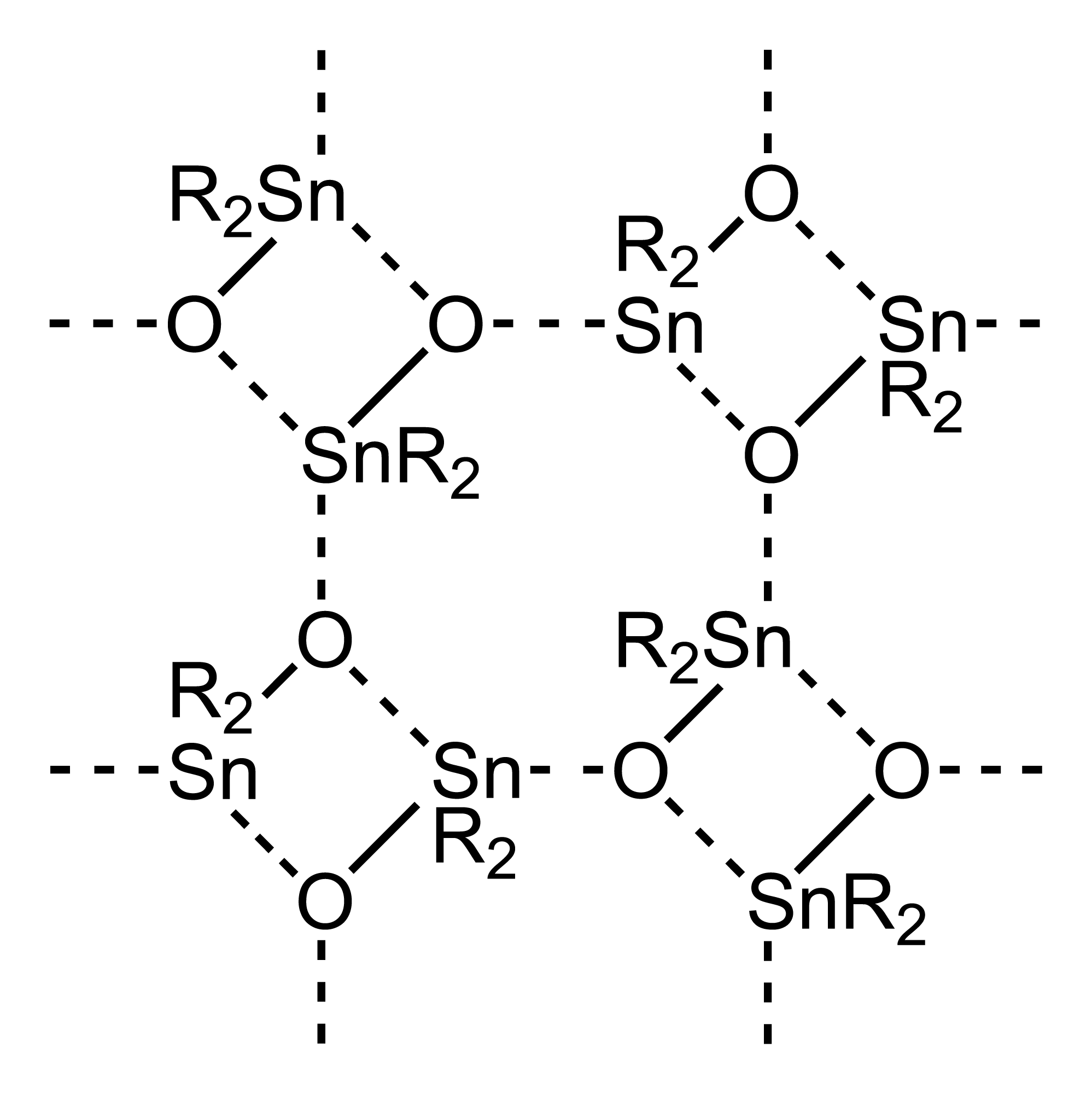
Structure of diorganotin oxide, highlighting the extensive intermolecular bonding.

=== Hypercoordinated stannanes ===
Unlike carbon(IV) analogues but somewhat like silicon compounds, tin(IV) can also be coordinated to five and even six atoms. These hypercoordinated compounds usually have electronegative substituents. Numerous examples of hypercoordinated compounds are provided by the organotin oxides and associated carboxylates and related pseudohalide derivatives. The organotin halides for adducts, e.g. (CH_{3})_{2}SnCl_{2}(bipyridine).

The all-organic penta- and hexaorganostannates(IV) have even been characterized, while in the subsequent year a six-coordinated tetraorganotin compound was reported. A crystal structure of room-temperature stable (in argon) all-carbon pentaorganostannate(IV) was reported as the lithium salt with this structure:

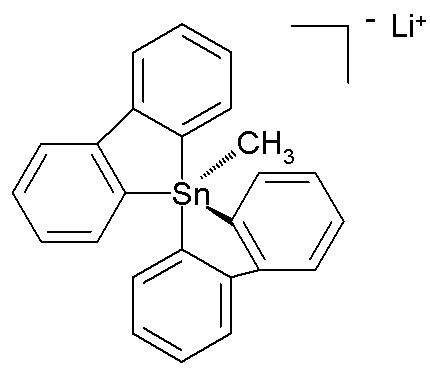

In this distorted trigonal bipyramidal structure the carbon to tin bond lengths (2.26 Å apical, 2.17 Å equatorial) are longer than regular C-Sn bonds (2.14 Å) reflecting its hypercoordinated nature.

== Tin radicals (organic derivatives of tin(III)) ==
Tin radicals, with the formula R_{3}Sn, are called stannyl radicals. They are a type of tetrel radical, and are invoked as intermediates in certain atom-transfer reactions. For example, tributyltin hydride (tris(n-butyl)stannane) serves as a useful source of "hydrogen atoms" because of the stability of the tributytin radical.

== Tin(II) compounds ==
Commonly, compounds with the formula RSn and RSnH feature Sn-Sn bonds (see next section). Some exceptions are observed with very bulky substituents. A variety of organotin(II) hydrides arise by addition of hydrogen to distannynes:

Ar·2Sn_{2} + H_{2} → [Ar·SnH]_{2} (Ar* = 2,6-disubstituted aryl)

== Compounds with tin-tin bonds ==
Many compounds are known with tin-tin single bonds. A simple example is hexaphenylditin, a colorless solid prepared by reduction of triphenyltin bromide:

2 (C_{6}H_{5})_{3}SnBr + 2 Na → (C_{6}H_{5})_{6}Sn_{2} + 2 NaBr

According to X-ray crystallography, it has an Sn-Sn bond (length: 277 pm). This distance contrasts with a typical C-C bond length of ca. 155 pm. Many compounds with the empirical formula SnR_{2} exist as rings or polymers when R is not bulky. The polymers, called polystannanes, have the formula (SnR_{2})_{n}.

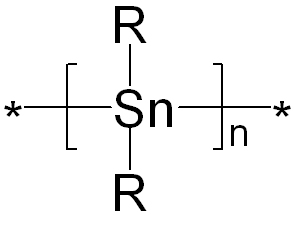

In principle, compounds of tin(II) might be expected to form a tin analogues of alkenes with a formal double bond between two tin atoms, i.e., (R_{2}Sn=SnR_{2}). Indeed, compounds with the formula R_{2}Sn=SnR_{2}, called distannenes or distannylenes, which are tin analogues of ethylenes R_{2}C=CR_{2}, are known for certain organic substituents. The Sn centres in stannenes are trigonal. But, contrary to the C centres in alkenes which are trigonal planar, the Sn centres in stannenes tend to be highly pyramidal. Monomeric compounds with the formula SnR_{2}, tin analogues of carbenes CR_{2} are also known in a few cases. One example is Sn(SiR_{3})_{2}, where R is the very bulky CH(Si(CH_{3})_{3})_{2}. Such species reversibly dimerize to the distannylene upon crystallization:

2 R_{2}Sn ⇌ R_{2}Sn=SnR_{2}

Stannenes, compounds with tin-carbon double bonds, are exemplified by derivatives of stannabenzene. Stannoles, structural analogs of cyclopentadiene, exhibit little C-Sn double bond character.

Compounds of Sn(I) are rare and only observed with very bulky ligands. One prominent family of cages is accessed by pyrolysis of the 2,6-diethylphenyl-substituted tristannylene [Sn(C_{6}H_{3}-2,6-Et_{2})_{2}]_{3}, which affords the cubane-type cluster and a prismane. These cages contain Sn(I) and have the formula [Sn(C_{6}H_{3}-2,6-Et_{2})]_{n} where n = 8, 10 and Et stands for ethyl group. A stannyne contains a tin atom to carbon group atom triple bond (e.g. R−Sn≡C−R and R−Sn≡Si−R), and a distannyne a triple bond between two tin atoms (R−Sn≡Sn−R). Distannynes only exist for extremely bulky substituents. Unlike alkynes, the C−Sn≡Sn−C core of these distannynes are nonlinear, although they are planar. The Sn-Sn distance is 3.066(1) Å, and the Sn-Sn-C angles are 99.25(14)°. Such compounds are prepared by reduction of bulky aryltin(II) halides.

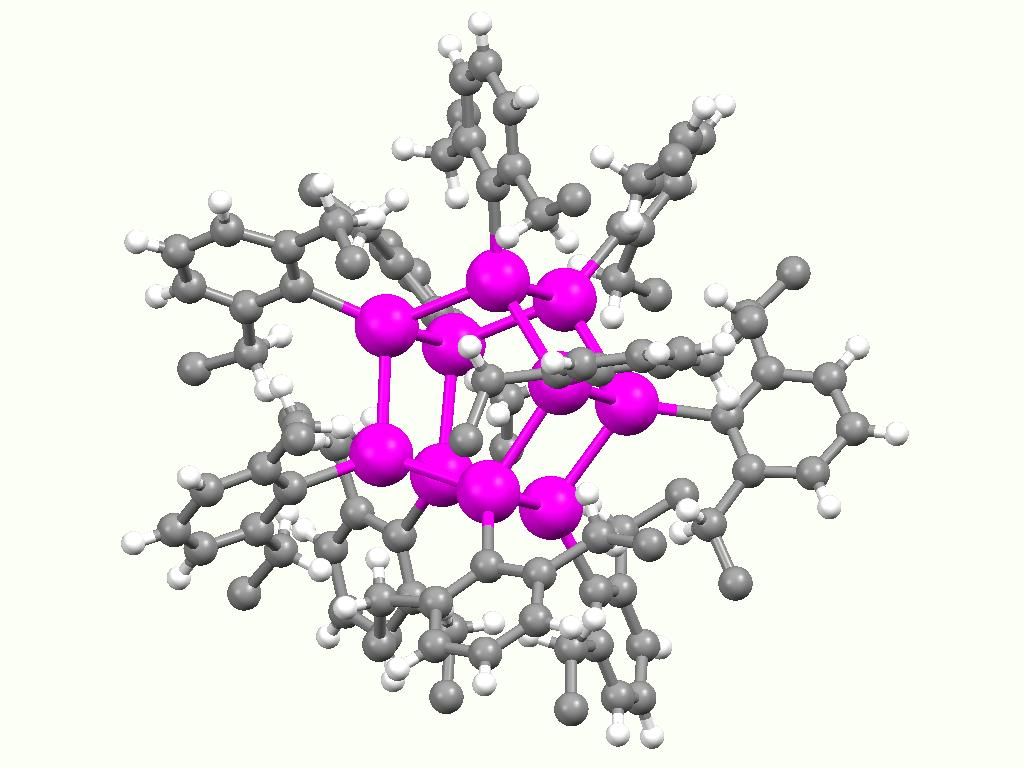
White (smallest) balls: H Grey balls: C Magenta (largest) balls: Sn Structure of an Ar_{10}Sn_{10} "prismane", a compound containing Sn(I) (Ar = 2,6-diethylphenyl).

== Reactions ==
Important reactions, discussed above, usually combine organotin halides and pseudohalides with nucleophiles. All-alkyl organotin compounds generally do not hydrolyze except in concentrated acid; the major exception being tin acetylides. An organostannane addition is nucleophilic addition of an allyl-, allenyl-, or propargylstannanes to aldehydes and imines, whereas hydrostannylation conveniently reduces only unpolarized multiple bonds.

Organotin hydrides are unstable to strong base, disproportionating to hydrogen gas and distannanes. The latter equilibrate with the corresponding radicals only in the continued presence of base, or if strongly sterically hindered. Conversely, mineral acids cleave distannanes to the organotin halide and more hydrogen gas.

In "pure" organic synthesis, organotin reactions are unpopular, because organotin wastes are difficult to separate from the desired product and toxic even in extremely low concentrations. Strategies to remove the wastes include forming insoluble iodides or fluorides or covalently affixing the tin compounds to a solid polymer surface.

Nevertheless, the Stille reaction is considered is a key coupling technique. In the Stille reaction, sp^{2}-hybridized organic halides (e.g. vinyl chloride CH_{2}=CHCl) catalyzed by palladium:

R^{1}−X + R^{2}−Sn(R^{3})_{3} R^{1}−R^{2} + X−Sn(R^{3})_{3}

Organotin compounds are also used extensively in radical chemistry (e.g. radical cyclizations, Barton–McCombie deoxygenation, Barton decarboxylation, etc.).

== Applications and toxicity ==
Organotin compounds

Tetrabutyltin colorless oil, precursor to the other butyl-tin compounds

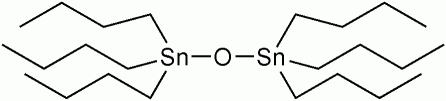
Tributyltin oxide, a colorless to pale yellow liquid used in wood preservation

Triphenyltin acetate, an off-white crystalline solid, used as an insecticide and a fungicide

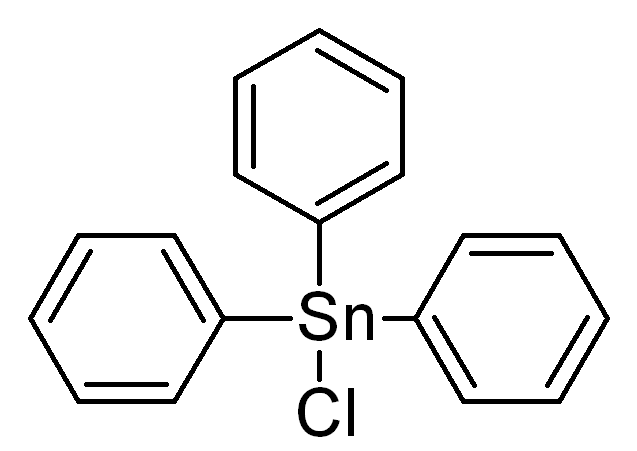
Triphenyltin chloride, a highly toxic white solid, used as a biocide

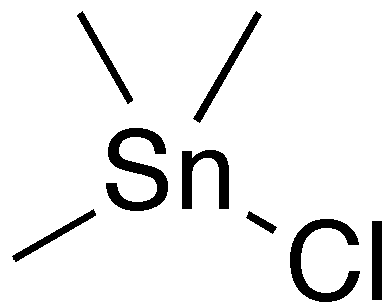
Trimethyltin chloride, a toxic white solid, once used as a biocide

Triphenyltin hydroxide, an off-white powder, used as a fungicide

Azocyclotin, a white solid, used as a long-acting acaricide for control of spider mites on plants

Cyhexatin, a white solid, used as an acaricide and miticide

Hexamethylditin used as an intermediate in chemical synthesis

Tetraethyltin, boiling point 63–65° at 12 mmHg. The "Et" symbol stands for ethyl group.

Organotin compounds, mainly diorganotin dithiolates (formula R_{2}Sn(SR')_{2}), heat-stabilize polyvinyl chloride during production. The plastic dehydrochlorinates and exhibits undesirable brittleness if heated unstabilized. The stabilizers work by reducing allylic chlorides to allylic mercaptans and absorbing catalytic hydrogen chloride.

Diorganotin carboxylates, e.g., dibutyltin dilaurate, catalyze the formation of polyurethanes, vulcanization of silicones, and certain transesterifications in industry.

n-Butyltin trichloride feeds chemical vapor deposition of tin dioxide layers during glass bottle manufacture.

Trialkyltin compounds are strong biocides. Tributyltin and triphenyltin derivatives are comparably toxic to hydrogen cyanide. Depending on the organic groups, trialkyltins can be powerful bactericides and fungicides, but they are phytotoxic and therefore cannot be used in agriculture.

Tributyltins are antifungal agents in textiles and paper, wood pulp and paper mill systems, breweries, and industrial cooling systems. Triphenyltin derivatives are used as active components of antifungal paints and agricultural fungicides. Other triorganotins are miticides and acaricides. Tributyltin oxide has been extensively used as a wood preservative.

Reflecting their high bioactivity, tributyltins were once used in marine anti-fouling paint. As anti-fouling compounds, organotin compounds have been replaced by dichlorooctylisothiazolinone.

=== In humans ===
The ototoxicity of organotin compounds in humans is not conclusively known. It is unlikely that organotin compounds can be inhaled or absorbed by skin contact in significant amounts, and there is little risk of exposure to the general public. Contamination of foods or plastic food containers with organotin compounds is uncommon.

== See also ==
- Organostannane addition
- Tributyltin azide
- Carbastannatranes
