= Fentin acetate =

Names
- IUPAC name (acetoxy)(triphenyl)stannane
- Other names Phentin acetate; Triphenyltin acetate; Triphenylstannyl acetate; Acetic acid tri(phenyl)stannyl ester, Brestan

Identifiers
CAS Number	900-95-8; 76-87-9 (fentin hydroxide)
3D model (JSmol)	Interactive image
ChEBI	CHEBI:81918
ChEMBL	ChEMBL474376
ChemSpider	8085060
ECHA InfoCard	100.011.804
EC Number	212-984-0
KEGG	C18728
PubChem CID	16682804
UNII	70M92GQA9T; KKL46V5313 (fentin hydroxide)
CompTox Dashboard (EPA)	DTXSID6021408
- InChI: InChI=1S/3C6H5.C2H4O2.Sn/c3*1-2-4-6-5-3-1;1-2(3)4;/h3*1-5H;1H3,(H,3,4);/q;;;;+1/p-1 Key: WDQNIWFZKXZFAY-UHFFFAOYSA-M; InChI=1/3C6H5.C2H4O2.Sn/c3*1-2-4-6-5-3-1;1-2(3)4;/h3*1-5H;1H3,(H,3,4);/q;;;;+1/p-1/rC18H15Sn.C2H4O2/c1-4-10-16(11-5-1)19(17-12-6-2-7-13-17)18-14-8-3-9-15-18;1-2(3)4/h1-15H;1H3,(H,3,4)/q+1;/p-1 Key: WDQNIWFZKXZFAY-FRUPRYIZAN
- SMILES: [O-]C(=O)C.c3c([Sn+](c1ccccc1)c2ccccc2)cccc3

Properties
Chemical formula	C_{20}H_{18}O_{2}Sn
Molar mass	409.07 g/mol
Melting point	122–124 °C (252–255 °F; 395–397 K)

Hazards
- Occupational safety and health (OHS/OSH)
Main hazards	Very toxic Dangerous for the environment
- GHS labelling
Pictograms	(GHS05: Corrosive) (GHS06: Toxic) (GHS08: Health hazard) (GHS09: Environmental hazard)
Signal word	Warning
Hazard statements	H301, H311, H315, H318, H330, H335, H351, H361d, H372, H410
Precautionary statements	P201, P202, P260, P264, P270, P271, P273, P280, P284, P301+P310, P302+P352, P304+P340, P305+P351+P338, P308+P313, P310, P320, P330, P332+P313, P361, P363, P391, P403+P233, P405, P501
- Lethal dose or concentration (LD, LC)
LD_{50} (median dose)	21 mg/kg (guinea pig, oral); 30 mg/kg (rabbit, oral); 81 mg/kg (mouse, oral); 125 mg/kg (rat, oral)
- Except where otherwise noted, data are given for materials in their standard state (at 25 °C [77 °F], 100 kPa). verify (what is ?) Infobox references

Fentin acetate is an organotin compound with the formula (C_{6}H_{5})_{3}SnO_{2}CCH_{3}. It is a colourless solid that was previously used as a fungicide.

== Structure ==
Most carboxylates of triphenyltin adopt polymeric structures with five-coordinate Sn centers.
