= Triphenyltin chloride =

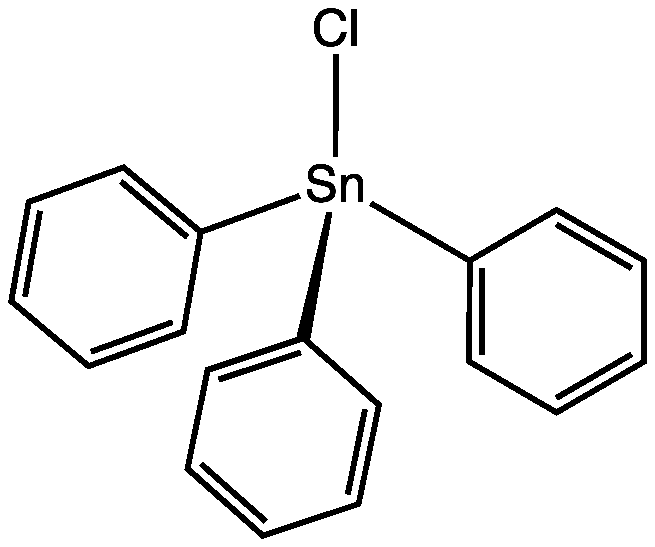

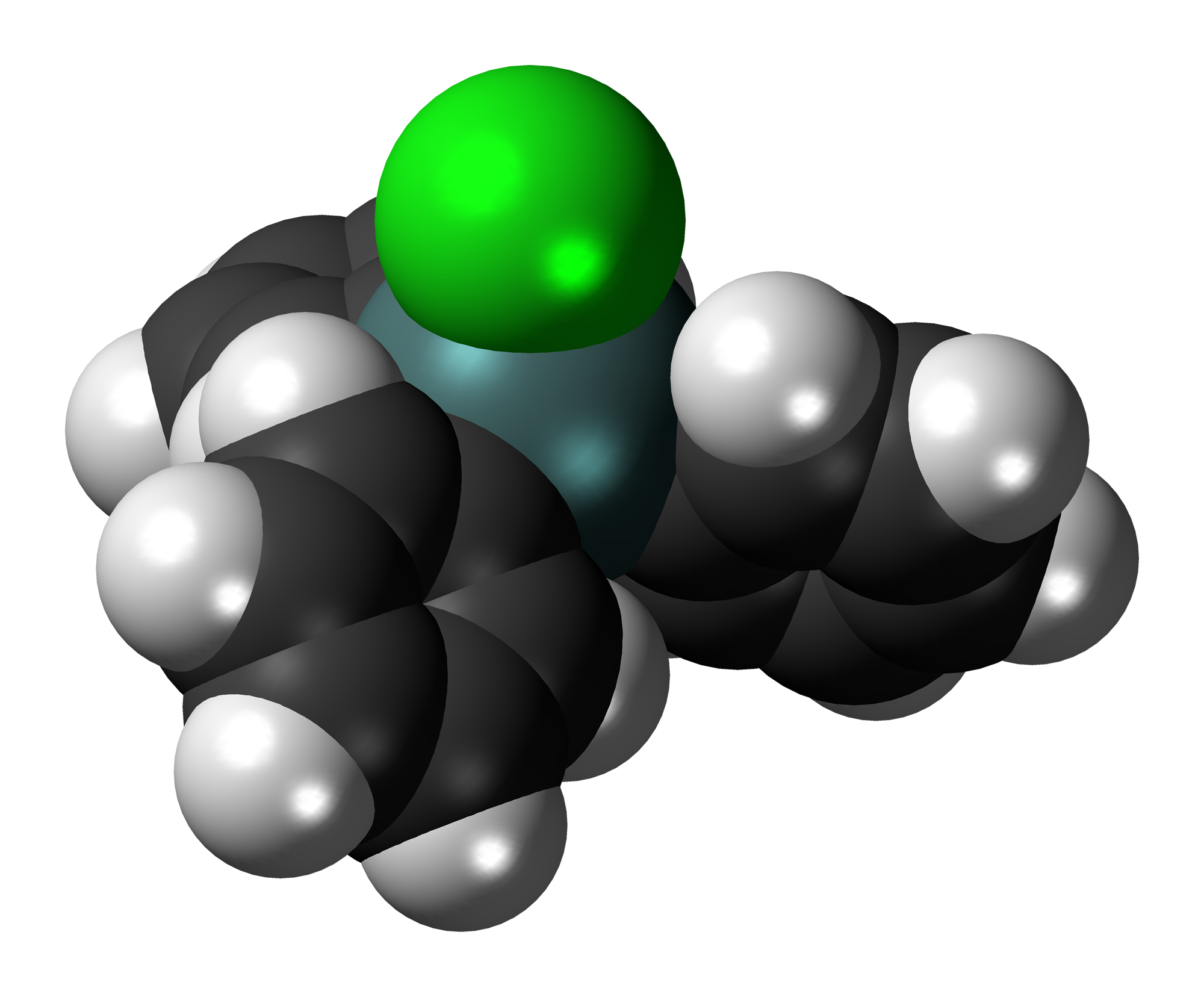

Names
- IUPAC name chlorotriphenylstannane

Identifiers
CAS Number	639-58-7
3D model (JSmol)	Interactive image
ChEMBL	ChEMBL515580
ChemSpider	12023
ECHA InfoCard	100.010.327
PubChem CID	12540
UNII	I1L80IDY27
CompTox Dashboard (EPA)	DTXSID2040733
- InChI: InChI=1S/3C6H5.ClH.Sn/c3*1-2-4-6-5-3-1;;/h3*1-5H;1H;/q;;;;+1/p-1 Key: NJVOZLGKTAPUTQ-UHFFFAOYSA-M; InChI=1/3C6H5.ClH.Sn/c3*1-2-4-6-5-3-1;;/h3*1-5H;1H;/q;;;;+1/p-1/rC18H15ClSn/c19-20(16-10-4-1-5-11-16,17-12-6-2-7-13-17)18-14-8-3-9-15-18/h1-15H Key: NJVOZLGKTAPUTQ-LLLCWGJXAQ
- SMILES: Cl[Sn](c1ccccc1)(c2ccccc2)c3ccccc3

Properties
Chemical formula	C_{18}H_{15}ClSn
Molar mass	385.4747 g/mol
Appearance	colourless solid
Melting point	108 °C (226 °F; 381 K)
Boiling point	240 °C (464 °F; 513 K)
Solubility in water	organic solvents
- Except where otherwise noted, data are given for materials in their standard state (at 25 °C [77 °F], 100 kPa). verify (what is ?) Infobox references

Triphenyltin chloride is an organotin compound with formula Sn(C_{6}H_{5})_{3}Cl. It is a colourless solid that dissolves in organic solvents and slowly reacts with water.

== Applications ==
The main use for this compound is as a fungicide and antifoulant. Triphenyl tin chloride is used as a chemosterilant. Triphenyl tins used as an antifeedants against potato cutworm.

In chemical analysis, triphenyltin chloride is used to derivatize metal carbonyl anions.

== Hazards ==
Triphenyltin chloride is as toxic as hydrogen cyanide. It also caused detrimental effects on body weight, testicular size and structure, and decreased fertility in Holtzmann rats.
