= Triphenyltin hydroxide =

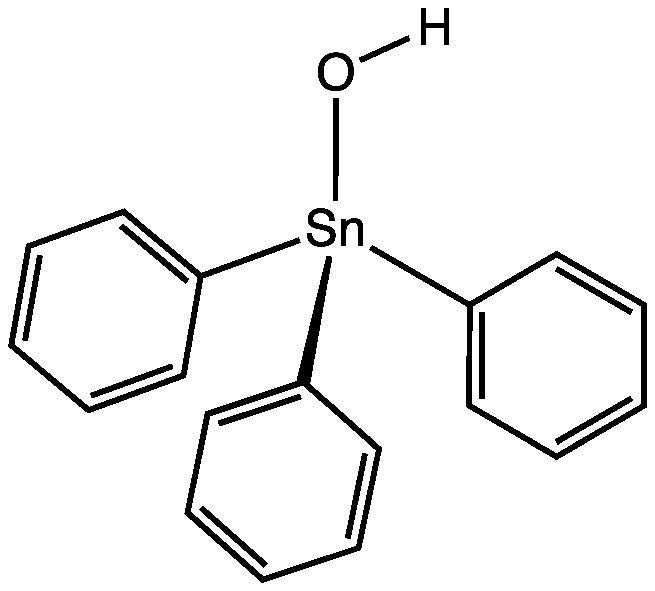

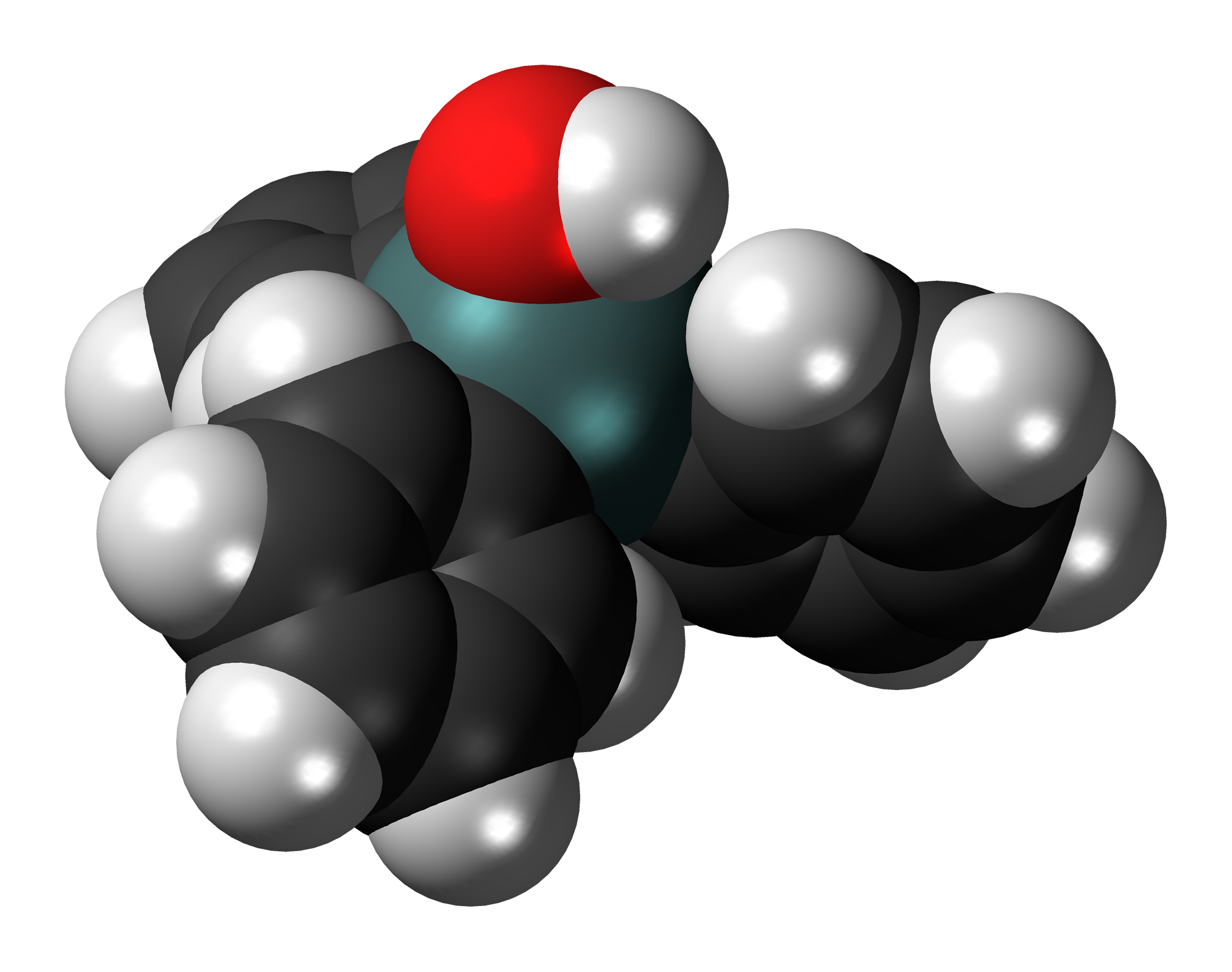

Names
- Preferred IUPAC name Triphenylstannanol

Identifiers
CAS Number	76-87-9
3D model (JSmol)	Interactive image
Beilstein Reference	4139186
ChEBI	CHEBI:30473
ChEMBL	ChEMBL506538
ChemSpider	21106510
ECHA InfoCard	100.000.901
EC Number	200-990-6
Gmelin Reference	7194
KEGG	C18729
PubChem CID	9907219
RTECS number	WH8575000
UNII	KKL46V5313
UN number	2786 2588
CompTox Dashboard (EPA)	DTXSID1021409 DTXSID50215768, DTXSID1021409
- InChI: InChI=1S/3C6H5.H2O.Sn/c3*1-2-4-6-5-3-1;;/h3*1-5H;1H2;/q;;;;+1/p-1 Key: BFWMWWXRWVJXSE-UHFFFAOYSA-M; InChI=1/3C6H5.H2O.Sn/c3*1-2-4-6-5-3-1;;/h3*1-5H;1H2;/q;;;;+1/p-1/rC18H16OSn/c19-20(16-10-4-1-5-11-16,17-12-6-2-7-13-17)18-14-8-3-9-15-18/h1-15,19H Key: BFWMWWXRWVJXSE-OLMCWIPIAE
- SMILES: O[Sn](c1ccccc1)(c2ccccc2)c3ccccc3

Properties
Chemical formula	Sn(C_{6}H_{5})_{3}OH
Molar mass	367.035 g·mol^{−1}
Appearance	White crystalline powder
Odor	Odorless
Melting point	121–123 °C (250–253 °F; 394–396 K)
Solubility in water	Insoluble
Solubility	Moderately soluble in most organic solvents.

Hazards
- GHS labelling
Pictograms	(GHS05: Corrosive) (GHS06: Toxic) (GHS07: Exclamation mark) (GHS08: Health hazard) (GHS09: Environmental hazard)
Signal word	Danger
Hazard statements	H301, H311, H315, H318, H330, H335, H351, H361, H372, H410
Precautionary statements	P201, P202, P260, P264, P270, P271, P273, P280, P281, P284, P301+P310, P302+P352, P304+P340, P305+P351+P338, P308+P313, P310, P312, P314, P320, P321, P330, P332+P313, P361, P362, P363, P391, P403+P233, P405, P501
- Except where otherwise noted, data are given for materials in their standard state (at 25 °C [77 °F], 100 kPa). verify (what is ?) Infobox references

Triphenyltin hydroxide is an organotin compound with formula Sn(C_{6}H_{5})_{3}OH. Triphenyltin hydroxide is used as a fungicide for potatoes, sugar beets, and pecans. It was first registered for use as a pesticide in the United States in 1971.

== Structure ==
Structure of solid triphenyltin hydroxide.

While triphenyltin hydroxide is often depicted as a monomer, it crystallizes as a polymer with a bridging hydroxide groups. The Sn-O distances are 2.18 and 2.250 Å. Many organotin compounds engage in similar aggregation equilibria.
