= Cyhexatin =

Organotin compound

Names
- IUPAC name Tricyclohexyltin hydroxide
- Other names: Cyhexatin; Lintex; Plictran; TCTH; Tricyclohexylhydroxytin; Tricyclohexyltin(IV) hydroxide; Tricyclohexylhydroxylstannane; Tricyclohexylstannanol

Identifiers
| CAS Number | 13121-70-5 |
| Beilstein Reference | 6099492 |
| ChEBI | CHEBI:4036 |
| ChemSpider | 10801387 |
| ECHA InfoCard | 100.032.757 |
| EC Number | 236-049-1 |
| Gmelin Reference | 31094 |
| KEGG | C11093 |
| PubChem CID | 6327054 (incorrect structure) |
| RTECS number | WH8750000 |
| UNII | 8YJV11QB4R |
| UN number | 2811 |
| CompTox Dashboard (EPA) | DTXSID1032357 |
- InChI: InChI=1S/3C6H11.H2O.Sn/c3*1-2-4-6-5-3-1;;/h3*1H,2-6H2;1H2;/q;;;;+1/p-1 Key: WCMMILVIRZAPLE-UHFFFAOYSA-M
- SMILES: C1CCC(CC1)[Sn](C2CCCCC2)(C3CCCCC3)O

Properties
| Chemical formula | (C_{6}H_{11})_{3}SnOH |
| Molar mass | 385.179 g·mol^{−1} |
| Appearance | Colorless crystals or white crystalline powder |
| Odor | Nearly odorless |
| Melting point | 196 °C (385 °F; 469 K) Decomposes above 121 to 131 °C (250 to 268 °F; 394 to 404 K) |
| Boiling point | 228 °C (442 °F; 501 K) (decomposes) |
| Solubility in water | Almost insoluble (less than 1 mg/L) |
| Solubility | Acetone 1.3 g/L; Dichloromethane 34 g/L; Carbon tetrachloride 28 g/L; Xylenes 3.6 g/L |
| Solubility in Chloroform | 216 g/kg |
| Solubility in Methanol | 37 g/kg |
| Solubility in Toluene | 10 g/kg |
| Solubility in Benzene | 16 g/kg |
| Vapor pressure | Negligible |

Hazards
- Occupational safety and health (OHS/OSH)
| Main hazards | Kidneys and liver damage. High exposure damages the nervous system. |
| Ingestion hazards | Abdominal pain, diarrhea, nausea, vomiting |
| Inhalation hazards | Respiratory system and throat irritation |
| Eye hazards | Irritation and burns |
| Skin hazards | Irritation and burns, can be absorbed into the body through the skin |
- GHS labelling
| Pictograms | (GHS07: Exclamation mark) (GHS09: Environmental hazard) |
| Signal word | Warning |
| Hazard statements | H302, H312, H332, H410 |
| Precautionary statements | P261, P264, P270, P271, P273, P280, P301+P317, P302+P352, P304+P340, P317, P321, P330, P362+P364, P391, P501 |
- Lethal dose or concentration (LD, LC)
| LD_{50} (median dose) | 458 mg/kg (oral, rabbit); 2422 mg/kg (skin, rabbit); 180 mg/kg (oral, rat); 446 mg/kg (skin, rat); 275 mg/kg (oral, mouse); 800 mg/kg (cat, oral); 800 mg/kg (oral, dog); 800 mg/kg (oral, monkey); 780 mg/kg (oral, guinea pig); 654 mg/kg (oral, chicken); 255 mg/kg (oral, quail) |
| LC_{50} (median concentration) | 244 mg/m^{3} (inhalation, rat), 290 mg/m^{3} (inhalation, mouse) |
- Except where otherwise noted, data are given for materials in their standard state (at 25 °C [77 °F], 100 kPa). Infobox references

Cyhexatin, also known as tricyclohexyltin hydroxide, is an organometallic compound of tin with the chemical formula (C_{6}H_{11})_{3}SnOH.

== Properties ==
Cyhexatin forms colorless crystals or white crystalline powder. It is practically insoluble in water. The powder is wettable by water.

== Reactions ==
Cyhexatin is stable in aqueous suspensions in neutral and alkaline conditions (pH above 6), but reacts exothermically with strong acids, acting as a base, to form salts. Reacts with strong oxidizers. Decomposes upon exposure to ultraviolet light to dicyclohexyltin oxide (C_{6}H_{11})_{2}SnO (which is not an analog of ketones R_{2}C=O because it exists as a polymer) and cyclohexylstannanoic acid (C_{6}H_{11})SnO_{2}H. Contact with metals may emit flammable hydrogen gas. Upon heating above 120 °C (248 °F) it decomposes to bis(tricyclohexyltin) oxide ((C_{6}H_{11})_{3}Sn)_{2}O, emitting irritating and toxic fumes and acrid smoke.

2 (C_{6}H_{11})_{3}SnOH → ((C_{6}H_{11})_{3}Sn)_{2}O + H_{2}O

== Uses ==
Cyhexatin is used in paints.

In agriculture, cyhexatin is used as a pesticide against insects, as well as parasitic mites that attack plants, like vegetables (e.g. cucurbits), fruit trees (e.g. pome fruits, stone fruits), hops, walnut, strawberry, vines and ornamentals. It acts by inhibiting mitochondrial ATP synthase, and is in IRAC group 12B). The chemical is not used in the United States.

== Hazards and toxicity ==
Cyhexatin is not combustible, but decomposes upon heating to produce corrosive and toxic fumes. Some components of those fumes are oxidizers, thus, they can cause combustible materials to ignite, like wood, oil, some plastics, paper and clothes. Containers of cyhexatin may explode when heated. Cyhexatin is very toxic to aquatic life.

Cyhexatin is not classified as a human carcinogen, but is classified as a teratogen. It is toxic by contact with skin, inhalation and ingestion. The compound and its fumes irritate and burn eyes. Contact with skin causes pruritus and burns. Cyhexatin can be absorbed into the body through the skin, and skin should be washed immediately upon contact with this chemical. Inhalation of its fumes causes irritation of the respiratory system, coughing, headache, dizziness and sore throat. It can cause abdominal pain, diarrhea, nausea and vomiting. It causes damage to kidneys and liver, as well as nervous system. Cyhexatin is a central nervous system depressant.
