= Mercury (element) =

Mercury, _{80}Hg
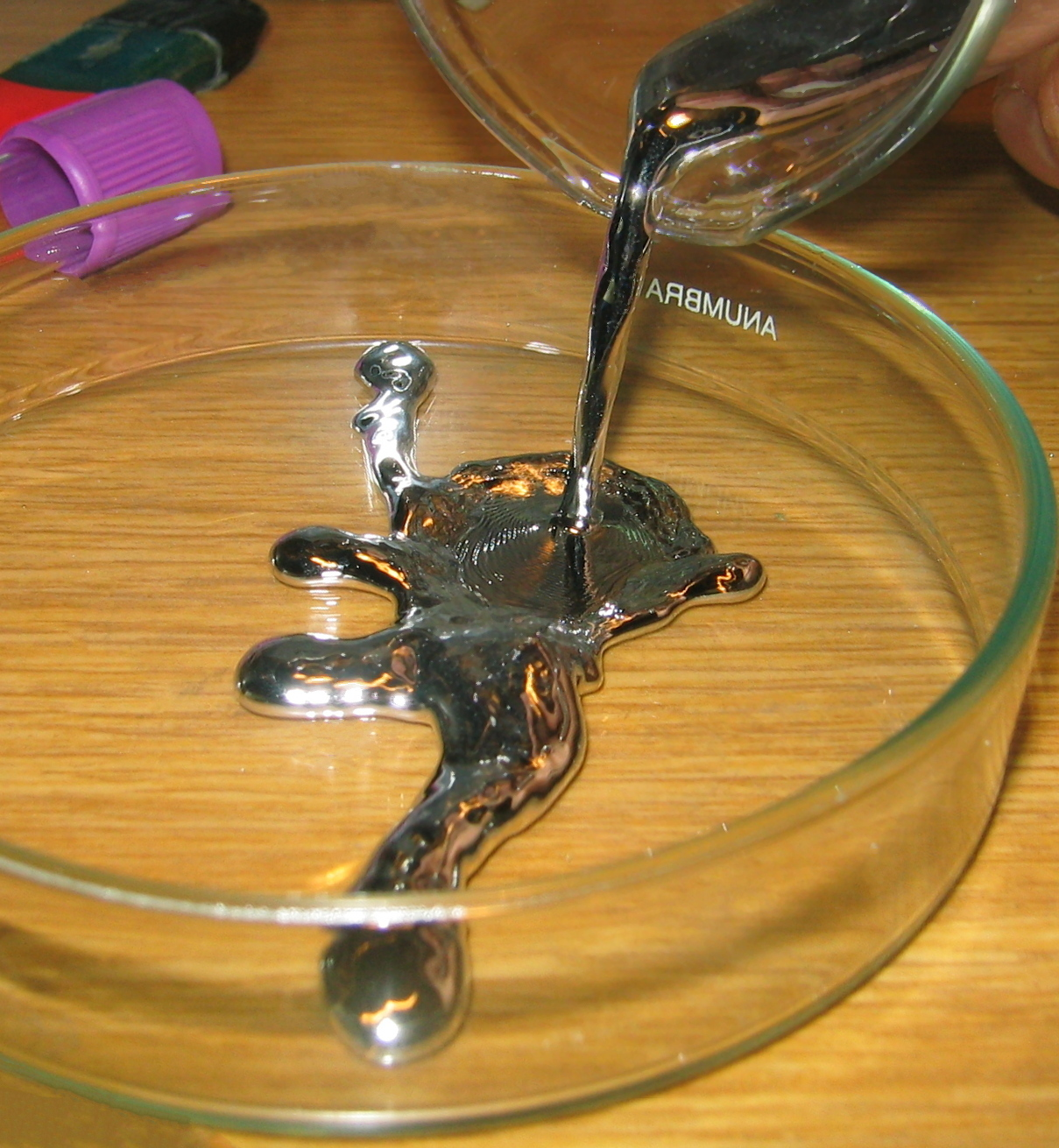

Mercury
- Alternative name: Hydrargyrum, pronounced: /ˈhɪˈdrɑːrdʒɪrəm/ (hi-DRAHR-ji-rəm)
- Appearance: shiny, silvery liquid

Standard atomic weight A_{r}°(Hg)
- 200.592±0.003; 200.59±0.01 (abridged)

Mercury in the periodic table
Hydrogen																															Helium
Lithium	Beryllium																									Boron	Carbon	Nitrogen	Oxygen	Fluorine	Neon
Sodium	Magnesium																									Aluminium	Silicon	Phosphorus	Sulfur	Chlorine	Argon
Potassium	Calcium															Scandium	Titanium	Vanadium	Chromium	Manganese	Iron	Cobalt	Nickel	Copper	Zinc	Gallium	Germanium	Arsenic	Selenium	Bromine	Krypton
Rubidium	Strontium															Yttrium	Zirconium	Niobium	Molybdenum	Technetium	Ruthenium	Rhodium	Palladium	Silver	Cadmium	Indium	Tin	Antimony	Tellurium	Iodine	Xenon
Caesium	Barium	Lanthanum	Cerium	Praseodymium	Neodymium	Promethium	Samarium	Europium	Gadolinium	Terbium	Dysprosium	Holmium	Erbium	Thulium	Ytterbium	Lutetium	Hafnium	Tantalum	Tungsten	Rhenium	Osmium	Iridium	Platinum	Gold	Mercury (element)	Thallium	Lead	Bismuth	Polonium	Astatine	Radon
Francium	Radium	Actinium	Thorium	Protactinium	Uranium	Neptunium	Plutonium	Americium	Curium	Berkelium	Californium	Einsteinium	Fermium	Mendelevium	Nobelium	Lawrencium	Rutherfordium	Dubnium	Seaborgium	Bohrium	Hassium	Meitnerium	Darmstadtium	Roentgenium	Copernicium	Nihonium	Flerovium	Moscovium	Livermorium	Tennessine	Oganesson
Cd
↑
Hg
↓
Cn
gold ← mercury → thallium
- Atomic number (Z): 80
- Group: group 12
- Period: period 6
- Block: d-block
- Electron configuration: [Xe] 4f^{14} 5d^{10} 6s^{2}
- Electrons per shell: 2, 8, 18, 32, 18, 2

Physical properties
- Phase at STP: liquid
- Melting point: 234.3210 K (−38.8290 °C, −37.8922 °F)
- Boiling point: 629.88 K (356.73 °C, 674.11 °F)
- Density (near r.t.): 13.546 g/cm^{3}
- Triple point: 234.3156 K, 1.65 × 10^{−7} kPa
- Critical point: 1750 K, 172.00 MPa
- Heat of fusion: 2.29 kJ/mol
- Heat of vaporization: 59.11 kJ/mol
- Molar heat capacity: 27.983 J/(mol·K)
- Specific heat capacity: 139.503 J/(kg·K)
Vapor pressure
P (Pa)	1	10	100	1 k	10 k	100 k
at T (K)	315	350	393	449	523	629

Atomic properties
- Oxidation states: common: +1, +2 −2
- Electronegativity: Pauling scale: 2.00
- Ionization energies: 1st: 1007.1 kJ/mol; 2nd: 1810 kJ/mol; 3rd: 3300 kJ/mol
- Atomic radius: empirical: 151 pm
- Covalent radius: 132±5 pm
- Van der Waals radius: 155 pm
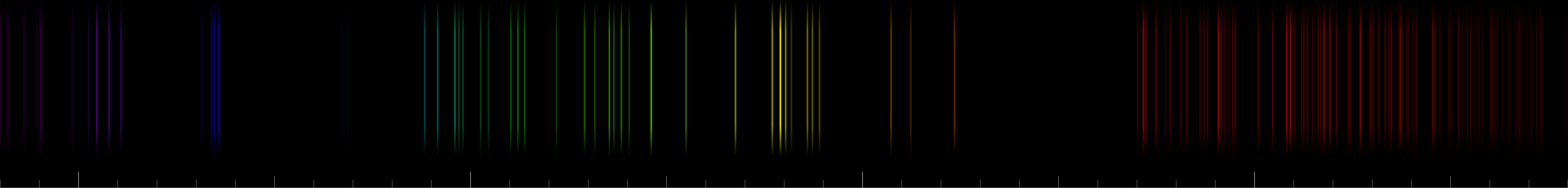
- Spectral lines of mercury

Other properties
- Natural occurrence: primordial
- Crystal structure: rhombohedral (hR1)
- Lattice constants: a_{r} = 301.06 pm α = 70.529° a_{h} = 347.64 pm c_{h} = 673.20 pm (at triple point)
- Thermal expansion: 60.4 µm/(m⋅K) (at 25 °C)
- Thermal conductivity: 8.30 W/(m⋅K)
- Electrical resistivity: 961 nΩ⋅m (at 25 °C)
- Magnetic ordering: diamagnetic
- Molar magnetic susceptibility: −33.44×10^{−6} cm^{3}/mol (293 K)
- Speed of sound: liquid: 1451.4 m/s (at 20 °C)
- CAS Number: 7439-97-6

History
- Naming: from the planet Mercury, with which it was associated in medieval alchemy
- Discovery: Ancient Egyptians (before 1500 BCE)
- Symbol: "Hg": from its Latin name hydrargyrum, itself from Greek hydrárgyros, 'water-silver'

Isotopes of mercury
Main isotopes			Decay	
Isotope	abundance	half-life (t_{1/2})	mode	product
^{194}Hg	synth	447 y	ε	^{194}Au
^{195}Hg	synth	10.7 h	β^{+}	^{195}Au
^{196}Hg	0.15%	stable		
^{197}Hg	synth	64.14 h	ε	^{197}Au
^{198}Hg	10.0%	stable		
^{199}Hg	16.9%	stable		
^{200}Hg	23.1%	stable		
^{201}Hg	13.2%	stable		
^{202}Hg	29.7%	stable		
^{203}Hg	synth	46.61 d	β^{−}	^{203}Tl
^{204}Hg	6.82%	stable		

Mercury is a chemical element; it has symbol Hg (from Latin hydrargyrum) and atomic number 80. It is commonly known as quicksilver. A heavy, silvery d-block element, mercury is the only metallic element that is known to be liquid at standard temperature and pressure. As well as having the lowest freezing point, mercury has the lowest boiling point and the narrowest liquid state range of any metal at standard conditions.

Mercury occurs in deposits throughout the world mostly as cinnabar (mercuric sulfide). The red pigment vermilion is obtained by grinding natural cinnabar or synthetic mercuric sulfide. Exposure to mercury and mercury-containing organic compounds is toxic to the nervous system, immune system and kidneys of humans and other animals; mercury poisoning can result from exposure to water-soluble forms of mercury (such as mercuric chloride or methylmercury) either directly or through mechanisms of biomagnification.

Mercury is used in thermometers, barometers, manometers, sphygmomanometers, float valves, mercury switches, mercury relays, fluorescent lamps and other devices, but concerns about the element's toxicity have led to a reduction in the amount of mercury used in these instruments, or manufacturers not using it altogether. It remains in use in scientific research applications and in amalgam for dental restoration in some locales. It is also still used in fluorescent lighting, although the quantity of mercury used is now smaller. Electricity passed through mercury vapor in a fluorescent lamp produces short-wave ultraviolet light, which then causes the phosphor in the tube to fluoresce, making visible light.

== Properties ==
=== Physical properties ===
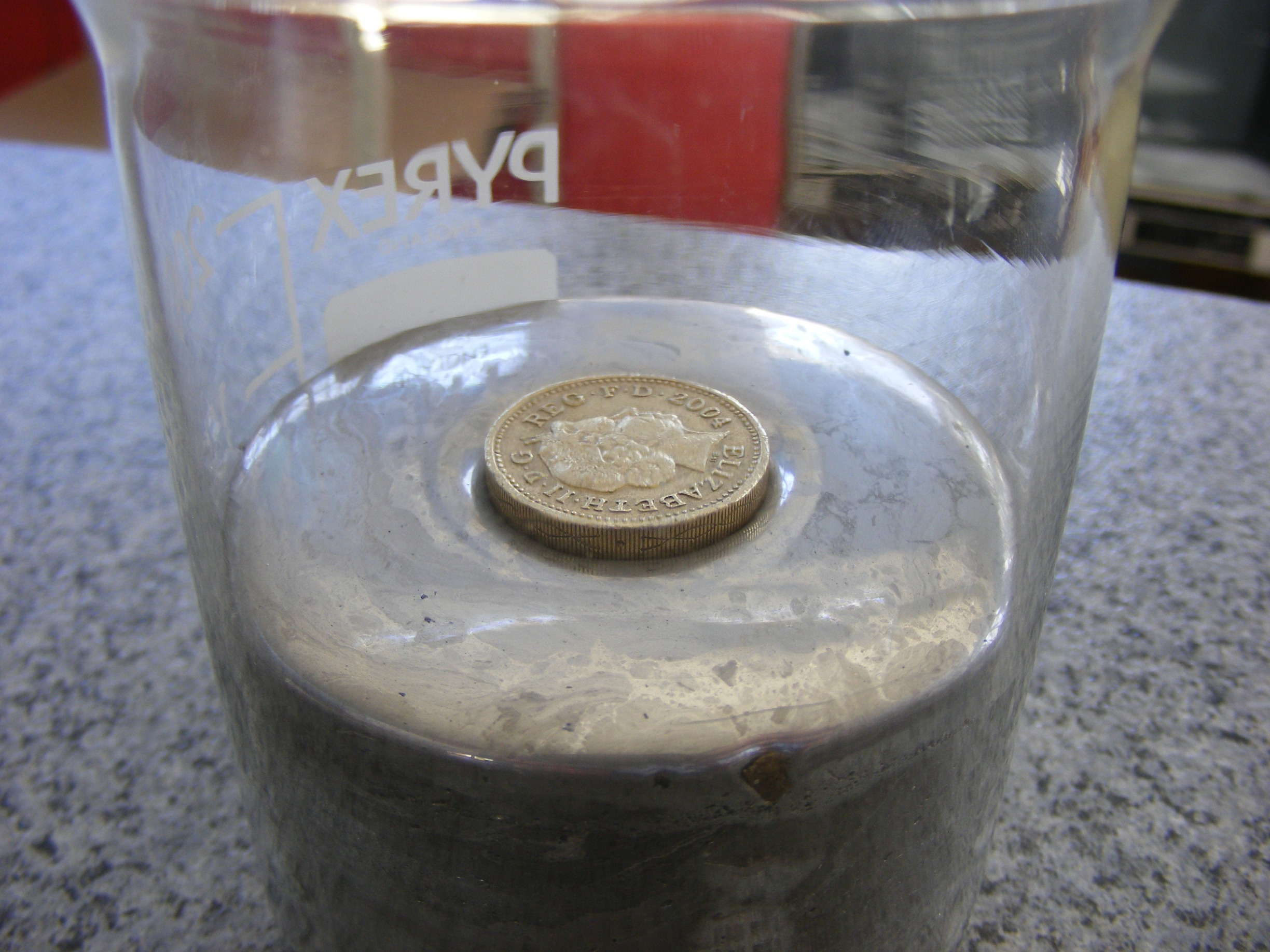
A round pound coin (density ~7.6 g/cm^{3}) floats on mercury due to the buoyancy force upon it and appears to float higher because of the strong surface tension of the mercury.

Mercury is a heavy, silvery-white metal. It is the only metallic element that is known to be liquid at standard temperature and pressure; (Note: Theoretical calculations indicate that copernicium, which lies directly beneath mercury on the periodic table, is likely a liquid at standard pressure and temperature.) the only other element that is liquid under these conditions is bromine, one of the halogens, though metals such as caesium, gallium, and rubidium melt just above room temperature. (Note: A room can easily reach 29 °C (302 K; 84 °F) to melt caesium, and 30 °C (303 K; 86 °F) to melt gallium. However, rubidium at 39 °C (312 K; 102 °F) is barely feasible unless on a hot summer day.) Compared to other metals, mercury is a poor conductor of heat, but a fair conductor of electricity.

Mercury has a melting point of −38.83 °C (−37.89 °F; 234.32 K) and a boiling point of 356.73 °C (674.11 °F; 629.88 K) both the lowest of any stable metal, resulting in the lowest stable liquid-state range of any metal under standard conditions. This effect is due to lanthanide contraction and relativistic contraction reducing the orbit radius of the outermost electrons, and thus weakening the metallic bonding in mercury. Upon freezing, the volume of mercury decreases by 3.59% and its density changes from 13.69 g/cm^{3} when liquid to 14.184 g/cm^{3} when solid. The coefficient of volume expansion is 181.59 × 10^{−6} at 0 °C, 181.71 × 10^{−6} at 20 °C and 182.50 × 10^{−6} at 100 °C (per °C). Solid mercury is malleable and ductile, and can be cut with a knife.

When expanded by heating near its critical point (around 1,750 K (1,480 °C; 2,690 °F) and 1,720 bars (172 MPa)), mercury exhibits a metal-nonmetal transition associated with sharp changes in its electronic conductivity and optical properties.

Mercury was the first known superconductor, discovered in 1911 by Heike Kamerlingh Onnes by cooling of mercury below 4 K (−269.15 °C; −452.47 °F) shortly after the discovery and production of liquid helium. Its superconductive properties were later determined to be unusual compared to other later-discovered superconductors, such as the more popular niobium alloys.

At room temperature (20 °C (293 K; 68 °F)), liquid mercury solidifies into a simple rhombohedral structure at approximately 1.2 gigapascals (12,000 bar) of pressure. On further compression, mercury undergoes several structural phase transitions into at least four distinct solid allotropes as compression increases, where the δ-phase with an hexagonal-close-packed (hcp) structure is stable above 36 gigapascals (360,000 bar) until at least 200 gigapascals (2,000,000 bar). The melting curve at high-pressure increases steeply on initial compression, but exhibits a pronounced flattening and a potential local maximum at around 9 gigapascals (90,000 bar). At 1 standard atmosphere (1.0 bar; 0.10 MPa)), liquid mercury exhibits an anomalously low first-shell coordination number, with each Hg atom having around 6 to 10 nearest neighbours, in contrast to simple metallic liquids in which atoms are densely-packed with 12 nearest neighbours. At simultaneous high-pressure and temperature conditions, the atomic arrangement in liquid mercury progresses towards a simple densely packed liquid structure. However, even at very high pressures (up to around 10 gigapascals (100,000 bar)), liquid mercury retains more many-body clusters than expected for a simple hard-sphere liquid.

=== Chemical properties ===
Mercury is somewhat more reactive than the noble metals gold and platinum that are close to it in the periodic table, but it is more stable than other the group 12 metals, zinc and cadmium. It reacts with oxidizing acids such as concentrated sulfuric acid and nitric acid or aqua regia to give mercury(II) sulfate, mercury(II) nitrate, and mercury(II) chloride, respectively. Like silver, mercury reacts with atmospheric hydrogen sulfide. Mercury reacts with solid sulfur flakes, which are used in mercury spill kits to absorb mercury (spill kits also use activated carbon and powdered zinc).

==== Amalgams ====
Mercury dissolves many metals such as gold and silver to form amalgams. Iron is an exception, and iron flasks have traditionally been used to transport the material. Several other first row transition metals (with the exception of manganese, copper and zinc) are also resistant in forming amalgams. Other elements that do not readily form amalgams with mercury include platinum. Sodium amalgam is a common reducing agent in organic synthesis, and is also used in high-pressure sodium lamps.

Mercury readily combines with aluminium to form a mercury-aluminium amalgam when the two pure metals come into contact. Since the amalgam destroys the aluminium oxide layer which protects metallic aluminium from oxidizing in-depth (as in iron rusting), even small amounts of mercury can seriously corrode aluminium. For this reason, mercury is not allowed aboard an aircraft under most circumstances because of the risk of it forming an amalgam with exposed aluminium parts in the aircraft.

Mercury embrittlement is the most common type of liquid metal embrittlement, as mercury is a natural component of some hydrocarbon reservoirs and will come into contact with petroleum processing equipment under normal conditions.

=== Isotopes ===
There are seven stable isotopes of mercury, with ^{202}Hg being the most abundant (29.86%). The longest-lived radioisotopes are ^{194}Hg with a half-life of 444 years, and ^{203}Hg with a half-life of 46.612 days. Most of the remaining radioisotopes have half-lives that are less than a day. ^{206}Hg occurs naturally in tiny traces as an intermediate decay product of ^{238}U. ^{199}Hg and ^{201}Hg are the most often studied NMR-active nuclei, having spins of 1/2 and 3/2 respectively.

== Etymology ==
The symbol for the planet Mercury (☿) has been used since ancient times to represent the element

Hg is the modern chemical symbol for mercury. It is an abbreviation of hydrargyrum, a romanized form of the ancient Greek name for mercury, ὑδράργυρος (hydrargyros). Hydrargyrum (/haɪˈdrɑːrdʒərəm/ hy-DRAR-jər-əm) has also been used in English, though the term is now dated. Hydrargyros is a Greek compound word meaning 'water-silver', from ὑδρ- (hydr-), the root of ὕδωρ (hydor) 'water', and ἄργυρος (argyros) 'silver'. Like the English name quicksilver ('living-silver'), this name was due to mercury's liquid and shiny properties.

The modern English name mercury comes from the planet Mercury. In medieval alchemy, the seven known metals—quicksilver, gold, silver, copper, iron, tin, and lead—were associated with the seven classical planets (Mercury, the sun, moon, Venus, Mars, Jupiter, and Saturn respectively). Quicksilver was associated with the fastest planet, which had been named after the Roman god Mercury, who was associated with speed and mobility. The astrological symbol for the planet became one of the alchemical symbols for the metal, and Mercury became an alternative name for the metal. Mercury is the only metal for which the alchemical planetary name survives, as it was decided it was preferable to quicksilver as a chemical name.

== History ==
Mercury was found in Egyptian tombs that date from 1500 BC; cinnabar, the most common natural source of mercury, has been in use since the Neolithic Age.

In China and Tibet, mercury use was thought to prolong life, heal fractures, and maintain generally good health, although it is now known that exposure to mercury vapor leads to serious adverse health effects. The first emperor of a unified China, Qín Shǐ Huáng Dì—allegedly buried in a tomb that contained rivers of flowing mercury on a model of the land he ruled, representative of the rivers of China—was reportedly killed by drinking a mercury and powdered jade mixture formulated by Qin alchemists intended as an elixir of immortality. Khumarawayh ibn Ahmad ibn Tulun, the second Tulunid ruler of Egypt (r. 884–896), known for his extravagance and profligacy, reportedly built a basin filled with mercury, on which he would lie on top of air-filled cushions and be rocked to sleep.

Quantities of liquid mercury, ranging from 90 to 600 grams (3.2 to 21.2 oz) have been recovered from a chamber 60 feet (18 m) below the 1800-year-old pyramid known as the Temple of the Feathered Serpent, the third-largest pyramid of Teotihuacan, Mexico, along with "jade statues, jaguar remains, a box filled with carved shells and rubber balls". In Lamanai, once a major city of the Maya civilization, a pool of mercury was found under a marker in a Mesoamerican ballcourt. This mercury may have been used in bowls as mirrors for divinatory purposes. Five of these date to the Classic Period of Maya civilization (c. 250–900) but one example predated this.

Aristotle recounts that Daedalus made a wooden statue of Aphrodite move by pouring quicksilver in its interior. In Greek mythology Daedalus gave the appearance of voice in his statues using quicksilver. The ancient Greeks used cinnabar (mercury sulfide) in ointments; the ancient Egyptians and the Romans used it in cosmetics. By 500 BC mercury was used to make amalgams (Medieval Latin amalgama, "alloy of mercury") with other metals.

Alchemists thought of mercury as the First Matter from which all metals were formed. They believed that different metals could be produced by varying the quality and quantity of sulfur contained within the mercury. The purest of these was gold, and mercury was called for in attempts at the transmutation of base (or impure) metals into gold, which was the goal of many alchemists.

The mines in Almadén (Spain), Monte Amiata (Italy), and Idrija (now Slovenia) dominated mercury production from the opening of the mine in Almadén 2500 years ago, until new deposits were found at the end of the 19th century.

The location of major 18th century Spanish silver mine districs (crossed pickaxes) and the mines involved in mercury supply needed for silver mining (purple dots).

Beginning in 1558, with the invention of the patio process to extract silver from ore using mercury, mercury became an essential resource in the economy of Spain and its American colonies. Mercury was used to extract silver from the lucrative mines in New Spain and Peru. Initially, the Spanish Crown's mines in Almadén in Southern Spain supplied all the mercury for the colonies. Mercury deposits were discovered in the New World, and more than 100,000 tons of mercury were mined from the region of Huancavelica, Peru, over the course of three centuries following the discovery of deposits there in 1563. In 1786 the main mine at Huancavelica suffered a sudden collapse that killed over 100 persons and greatly reduced the mine's output. Through the legalization of scavenging known as pallaqueo mercury production rose again peaking in 1794–1796. The French Revolutionary Wars disrupted European mercury supply to Spanish America leading to an increasing reliance for the mines in present-day Peru and Bolivia on mercury from Huancavelica but this mines production was clearly by 1799 not enough to supply the demand in the Andean mines. Spain abolished the royal mercury monopoly in 1813.

Mercury poisoning in the mines left many people disabled through the early modern period but mercury itself was not the chief cause of deaths in the mines.

The patio process and later pan amalgamation process continued to create great demand for mercury to treat silver ores until the late 19th century.

From the mid-18th to the mid-19th centuries, a process called "carroting" was used in the making of felt hats. Animal skins were rinsed in an orange solution (the term "carroting" arose from this color) of the mercury compound mercuric nitrate, Hg(NO_{3})_{2}. This process separated the fur from the pelt and matted it together. This solution and the vapors it produced were highly toxic. The United States Public Health Service banned the use of mercury in the felt industry in December 1941. The psychological symptoms associated with mercury poisoning inspired the phrase "mad as a hatter". Lewis Carroll's "Mad Hatter" in his book Alice's Adventures in Wonderland was a play on words based on the older phrase, but the character himself does not exhibit symptoms of mercury poisoning.

== Occurrence ==
Mercury production

Mercury is an extremely rare element in Earth's crust; it has an average crustal abundance by mass of only 0.08 parts per million (ppm) and is the 66th most abundant element in the Earth's crust. Because it does not blend geochemically with those elements that constitute the majority of the crustal mass, mercury ores can be extraordinarily concentrated considering the element's abundance in ordinary rock. The richest mercury ores contain up to 2.5% mercury by mass, and even the leanest concentrated deposits are at least 0.1% mercury (12,000 times average crustal abundance). It is found either as a native metal (rare) or in cinnabar, metacinnabar, sphalerite, corderoite, livingstonite and other minerals, with cinnabar (HgS) being the most common ore. Mercury ores often occur in hot springs or other volcanic regions.

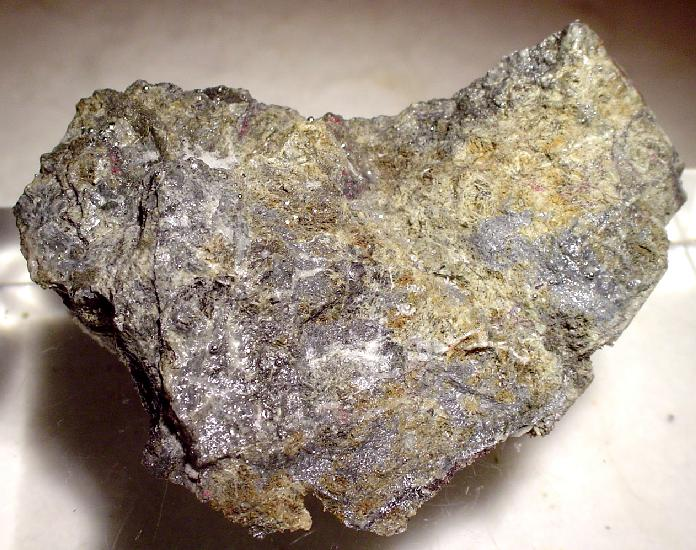
Native mercury with cinnabar, Socrates mine, Sonoma County, California. Cinnabar sometimes alters to native mercury in the oxidized zone of mercury deposits.

Former mines in Italy, the United States and Mexico, which once produced a large proportion of the world supply, have now been completely mined out or, in the case of Slovenia (Idrija) and Spain (Almadén), shut down due to the fall of the price of mercury. Nevada's McDermitt Mine, the last mercury mine in the United States, closed in 1992. The price of mercury has been highly volatile over the years and in 2006 was $650 per 76-pound (34.46 kg) flask.

Mercury is extracted by heating cinnabar in a current of air and condensing the vapor. The global mass balance equation for this redox reaction, in which sulfide (S^{2−}) is oxidized by atmospheric oxygen to sulfur dioxide (SO_{2}) while Hg^{2+} is reduced to metallic Hg, is:

HgS + O_{2} → Hg + SO_{2}

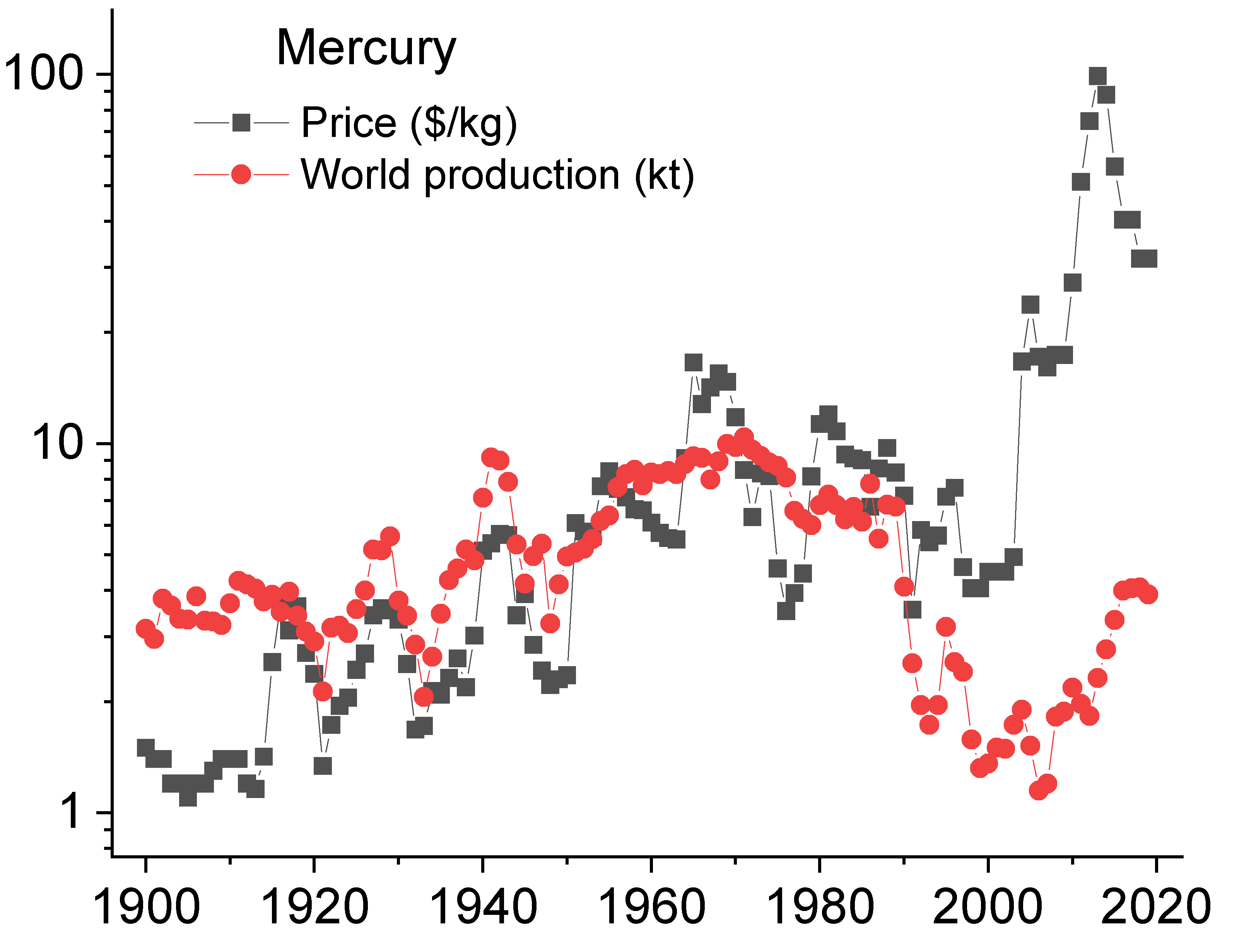
Evolution of mercury price (U.S.) and production (worldwide)

In 2020, China was the top producer of mercury, providing 88% of the world output (2200 out of 2500 tonnes), followed by Tajikistan (178 t), Russia (50 t) and Mexico (32 t).

Mercury production by country in 2022–24 (tonnes)
Country	Production
World	1,200
China *	1,000
Tajikistan *	100
Peru *	30
Russia	30
Norway *	20
United States	15
Mexico	10
Kyrgyzstan	6
Morocco	2

Because of the high toxicity of mercury, both the mining of cinnabar and refining for mercury are hazardous and historic causes of mercury poisoning. In China, prison labor was used by a private mining company as recently as the 1950s to develop new cinnabar mines. Thousands of prisoners were used by the Luo Xi mining company to establish new tunnels. Worker health in functioning mines is at high risk.

A newspaper claimed that an unidentified European Union directive mandating energy-efficient lightbulbs by 2012 prompted China to reopen cinnabar mines to obtain the mercury required for compact fluorescent lamp (CFL) manufacture. Environmental dangers have been a concern, particularly in the southern cities of Foshan and Guangzhou, and in Guizhou province in the southwest.

Abandoned mercury mine processing sites often contain very hazardous waste piles of roasted cinnabar calcines. Water run-off from such sites is a recognized source of ecological damage. Former mercury mines may be suited for constructive reuse; for example, in 1976 Santa Clara County, California purchased the historic Almaden Quicksilver Mine and created a county park on the site after conducting extensive safety and environmental analyses of the property.

== Chemistry ==
=== Compounds of mercury(I) ===
Unlike its lighter neighbors, cadmium and zinc, mercury usually forms simple stable compounds with metal-metal bonds. Most mercury(I) compounds are diamagnetic and feature the dimeric cation, Hg^{2+}_{2}. Stable derivatives include the chloride and nitrate. In aqueous solution of a mercury(I) salt, slight disproportion of Hg^{2+}_{2} into Hg and Hg^{2+} results in >0.5% of dissolved mercury existing as Hg^{2+}. In these solutions, complexation of the Hg^{2+} with addition of ligands such as cyanide causes disproportionation to go to completion, with all Hg^{2+}_{2} precipitating as elemental mercury and insoluble mercury(II) compounds (e.g. mercury(II) cyanide if cyanide is used as the ligand). Mercury(I) chloride, a colorless solid also known as calomel, is really the compound with the formula Hg_{2}Cl_{2}, with the connectivity Cl-Hg-Hg-Cl. It reacts with chlorine to give mercury(II) chloride, which resists further oxidation. Mercury(I) hydride, a colorless gas, has the formula HgH, containing no Hg-Hg bond; however, the gas has only ever been observed as isolated molecules.

Indicative of its tendency to bond to itself, mercury forms mercury polycations, which consist of linear chains of mercury centers, capped with a positive charge. One example is Hg_{3}(AsF_{6})_{2} containing the Hg_{3}^{2+} cation.

=== Compounds of mercury(II) ===
Mercury(II) is the most common oxidation state and is the main one in nature as well. All four mercuric halides are known and have been demonstrated to form linear coordination geometry, despite mercury's tendency to form tetrahedral molecular geometry with other ligands. This behavior is similar to the Ag^{+} ion. The best known mercury halide is mercury(II) chloride, an easily sublimating white solid.

Mercury(II) oxide, the main oxide of mercury, arises when the metal is exposed to air for long periods at elevated temperatures. It reverts to the elements upon heating near 400 °C, as was demonstrated by Joseph Priestley in an early synthesis of pure oxygen. Hydroxides of mercury are poorly characterized, as attempted isolation studies of mercury(II) hydroxide have yielded mercury oxide instead.

Being a soft metal, mercury forms very stable derivatives with the heavier chalcogens. Preeminent is mercury(II) sulfide, HgS, which occurs in nature as the ore cinnabar and is the brilliant pigment vermilion. Like ZnS, HgS crystallizes in two forms, the reddish cubic form and the black zinc blende form. The latter sometimes occurs naturally as metacinnabar. Mercury(II) selenide (HgSe) and mercury(II) telluride (HgTe) are known, these as well as various derivatives, e.g. mercury cadmium telluride and mercury zinc telluride being semiconductors useful as infrared detector materials.

Mercury(II) salts form a variety of complex derivatives with ammonia. These include Millon's base (Hg_{2}N^{+}), the one-dimensional polymer (salts of (HgNH_{2}^{+})n), and "fusible white precipitate" or [Hg(NH_{3})_{2}]Cl_{2}. Known as Nessler's reagent, potassium tetraiodomercurate(II) (K_{2}HgI_{4}) is still occasionally used to test for ammonia owing to its tendency to form the deeply colored iodide salt of Millon's base.

Mercury(II) fulminate is a primary explosive used in detonators, but it has largely been replaced by lead azide.

=== Other oxidation states ===
Experiments have failed to unequivocally demonstrate any higher oxidation states: both the claimed 1976 electrosynthesis of an unstable Hg(III) species and 2007 cryogenic isolation of HgF_{4} have disputed interpretations and remain difficult (if not impossible) to reproduce. Nevertheless, HgF_{3} and HgF_{4} are predicted to exist under extreme pressures. Mercury can form compounds where it is in negative oxidation state, such as the intermetallic compound MgHg and Cs_{18}Hg_{8}O_{6} with the Hg^{6–}_{8} anion.

=== Organomercury compounds ===
Organic mercury compounds are historically important but are of little industrial value in the western world. Mercury(II) salts are a rare example of simple metal complexes that react directly with aromatic rings. Organomercury compounds are always divalent and usually two-coordinate and linear geometry. Unlike organocadmium and organozinc compounds, organomercury compounds do not react with water. They usually have the formula HgR_{2}, which are often volatile, or HgRX, which are often solids, where R is aryl or alkyl and X is usually halide or acetate. Methylmercury, a generic term for compounds with the formula CH_{3}HgX, is a dangerous family of compounds that are often found in polluted water. They arise by a process known as biomethylation.

== Use in medicine ==
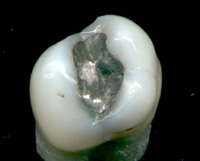
Dental amalgam filling a decayed molar tooth

=== Historical and traditional ===
Mercury and its compounds have historically been used in medicine, although they are much less common today than they once were, now that the toxic effects of mercury and its compounds are more widely understood. An example of the early therapeutic application of mercury was published in 1787 by James Lind. The first edition of The Merck Manuals (1899) featured many then-medically relevant mercuric compounds, such as mercury-ammonium chloride, yellow mercury proto-iodide, calomel, and mercuric chloride, among others. Blue mass, a pill or syrup in which mercury is the main ingredient, was prescribed throughout the 19th century for numerous conditions including constipation, depression, child-bearing and toothaches. In the early 20th century, mercury was administered to children yearly as a laxative and dewormer, and it was used in teething powders for infants. The mercury-containing organohalide merbromin (sometimes sold as Mercurochrome) is still widely used but has been banned in some countries, such as the U.S.

Mercury in the form of one of its common ores, cinnabar, is used in various traditional medicines, especially in traditional Chinese medicine. A review of its safety has found that cinnabar can lead to significant mercury intoxication when heated, consumed in overdose, or taken long term, and can have adverse effects at therapeutic doses, though effects from therapeutic doses are typically reversible. Although this form of mercury appears to be less toxic than other forms, its use in traditional Chinese medicine has not yet been justified, as the therapeutic basis for cinnabar is unclear. Mercury(I) chloride (also known as calomel or mercurous chloride) has been used in traditional medicine as a diuretic, topical disinfectant, and laxative. Mercury(II) chloride (also known as mercuric chloride or corrosive sublimate) was once used to treat syphilis (along with other mercury compounds), although it is so toxic that sometimes the symptoms of its toxicity were confused with those of the syphilis it was believed to treat.

=== Contemporary ===
In contemporary medicine, mercury remains an ingredient in dental amalgams. Thiomersal (called Thimerosal in the United States) is an organic compound used as a preservative in vaccines, although this use is in decline. Although it was widely speculated that this mercury-based preservative could cause or trigger autism in children, no evidence supports any such link. Nevertheless, thiomersal has been removed from, or reduced to trace amounts in, all U.S. vaccines recommended for children 6 years of age and under, with the exception of the inactivated influenza vaccine. Merbromin (Mercurochrome), another mercury compound, is a topical antiseptic used for minor cuts and scrapes in some countries. Today, the use of mercury in medicine has greatly declined in all respects, especially in developed countries. Mercury is still used in some diuretics, although substitutes such as thiazides now exist for most therapeutic uses.

In 2003, mercury compounds were found in some over-the-counter drugs, including topical antiseptics, stimulant laxatives, diaper-rash ointment, eye drops, and nasal sprays. The FDA has "inadequate data to establish general recognition of the safety and effectiveness" of the mercury ingredients in these products. Mercury is effective as an active ingredient in skin whitening compounds used to depigment skin. The Minamata Convention on Mercury limits the concentration of mercury in such whiteners to 1 part per million. However, as of 2022, many commercially available whitener products still exceed that limit and are considered toxic.

== Industrial, technological, and scientific uses ==
Mercury is used primarily for the manufacture of industrial chemicals or for electrical and electronic applications. It is used in some liquid-in-glass thermometers, especially those used to measure high temperatures. A still increasing amount is used as gaseous mercury in fluorescent lamps, while most of the other applications are slowly being phased out due to health and safety regulations. In some applications, mercury is replaced with less toxic but considerably more expensive Galinstan alloy.

=== Measuring instruments ===
Thermometers containing mercury were invented in the early 18th century by Daniel Gabriel Fahrenheit, though earlier attempts at making temperature-measuring instruments filled with quicksilver had been described in the 1650s. Fahrenheit's mercury thermometer was based on an earlier design that used alcohol rather than mercury; the mercury thermometer was significantly more accurate than those using alcohol. Historically, mercury sphygmomanometers, barometers, diffusion pumps, coulometers, and many other laboratory instruments also took advantage of mercury's properties as a very dense, opaque liquid with a nearly linear thermal expansion.

From the early 21st century onwards, the use of mercury thermometers has been declining, and mercury-containing instruments have been banned in many jurisdictions following the 1998 Protocol on Heavy Metals. Modern alternatives to mercury thermometers include resistance thermometers, thermocouples, and thermistor sensors that output to a digital display.

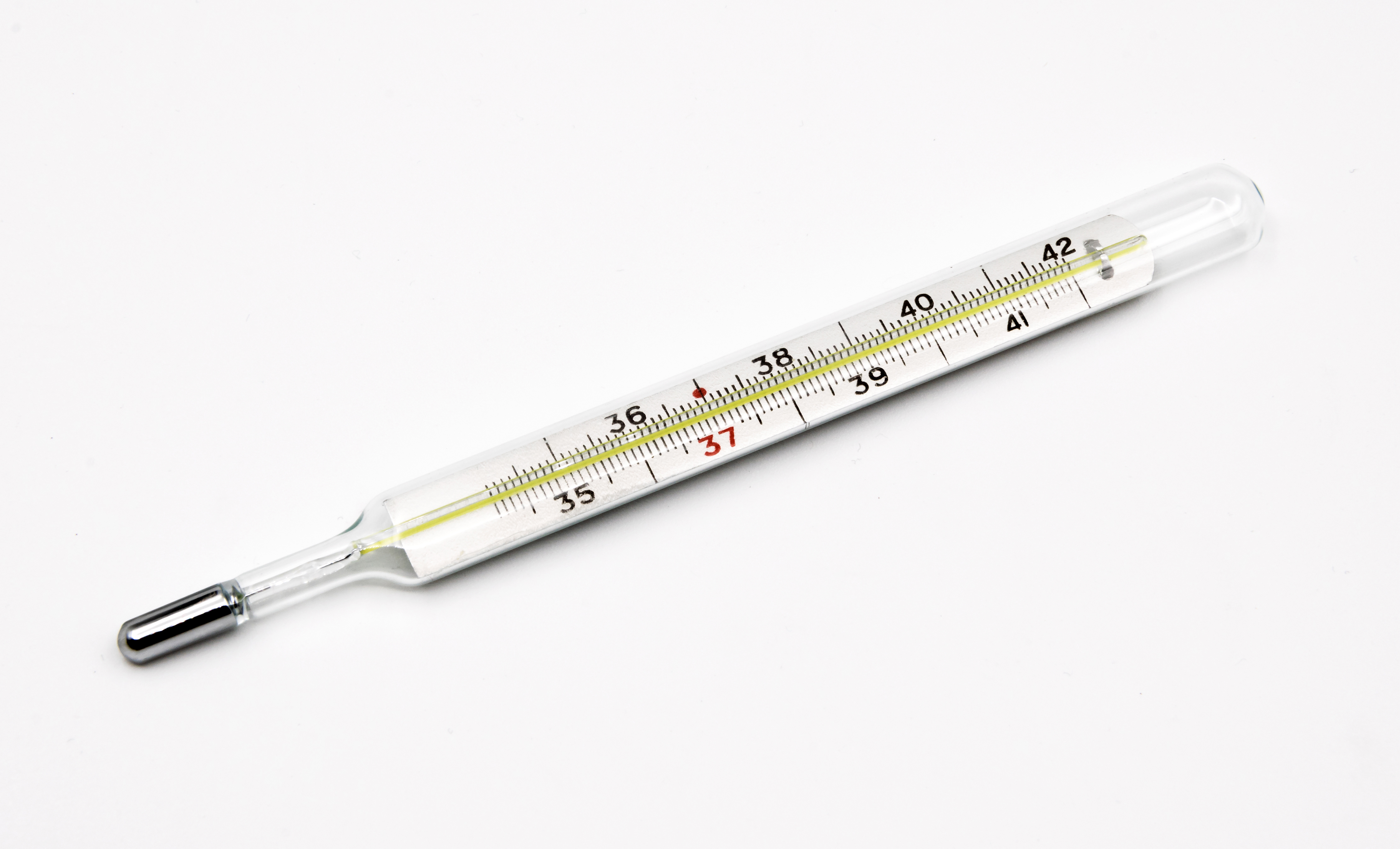
Medical mercury thermometer.

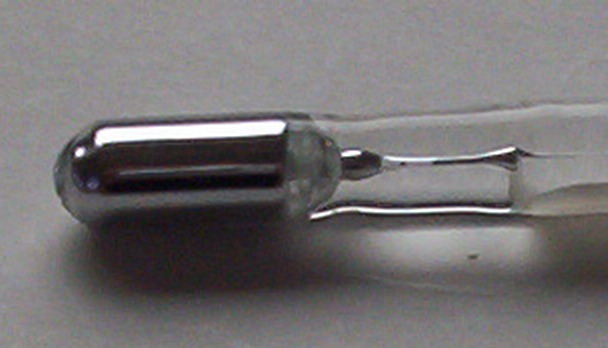
The bulb of a mercury-in-glass thermometer.

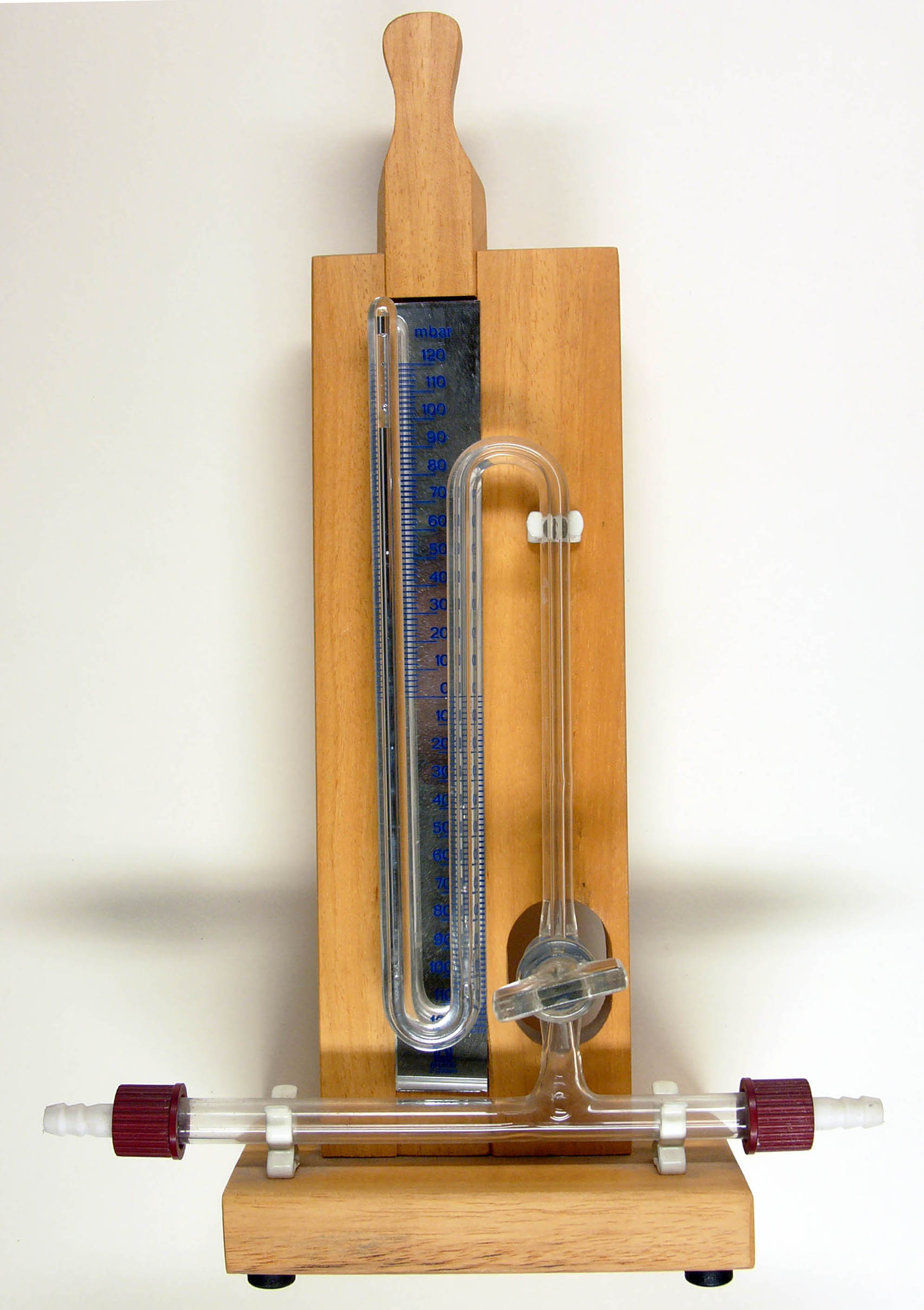
Mercury manometer to measure pressure.

=== Lighting ===
Gaseous mercury is used in mercury-vapor lamps, fluorescent lamps, and some neon signs. Those low-pressure lamps emit very spectrally narrow lines, which are traditionally used in optical spectroscopy for calibration of spectral position. Commercial calibration lamps are sold for this purpose; reflecting a fluorescent ceiling light into a spectrometer is a common calibration practice. Gaseous mercury is also found in some electron tubes, including ignitrons, thyratrons, and mercury arc rectifiers. It is also used in specialist medical care lamps for skin tanning and disinfection. Gaseous mercury is added to cold cathode argon-filled lamps to increase the ionization and electrical conductivity. An argon-filled lamp without mercury will have dull spots and will fail to light correctly. Lighting containing mercury can be bombarded/oven pumped only once. When added to neon filled tubes, inconsistent red and blue spots are produced in the light emissions until the initial burning-in process is completed; eventually it will light a consistent dull off-blue color.

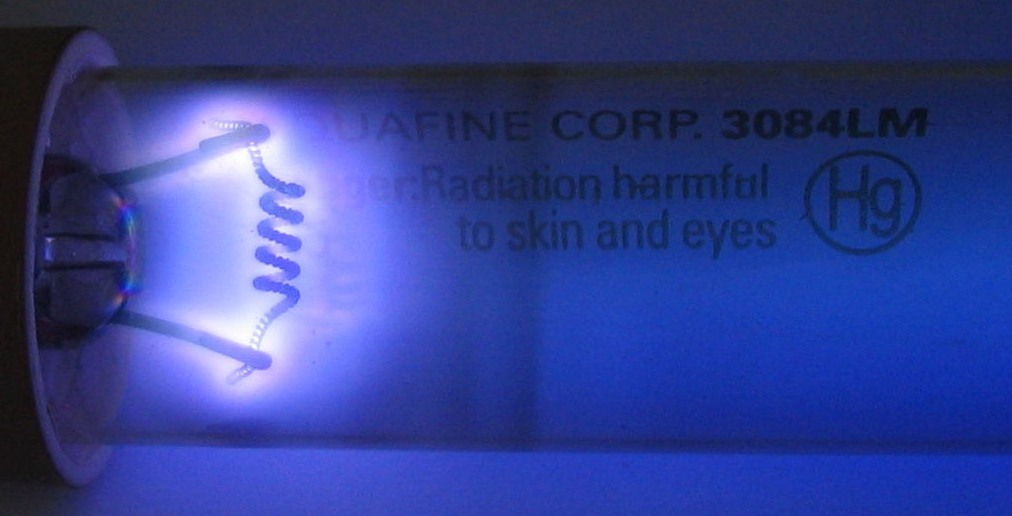
The deep violet glow of a mercury vapor discharge in a germicidal lamp, whose spectrum is rich in invisible ultraviolet radiation.

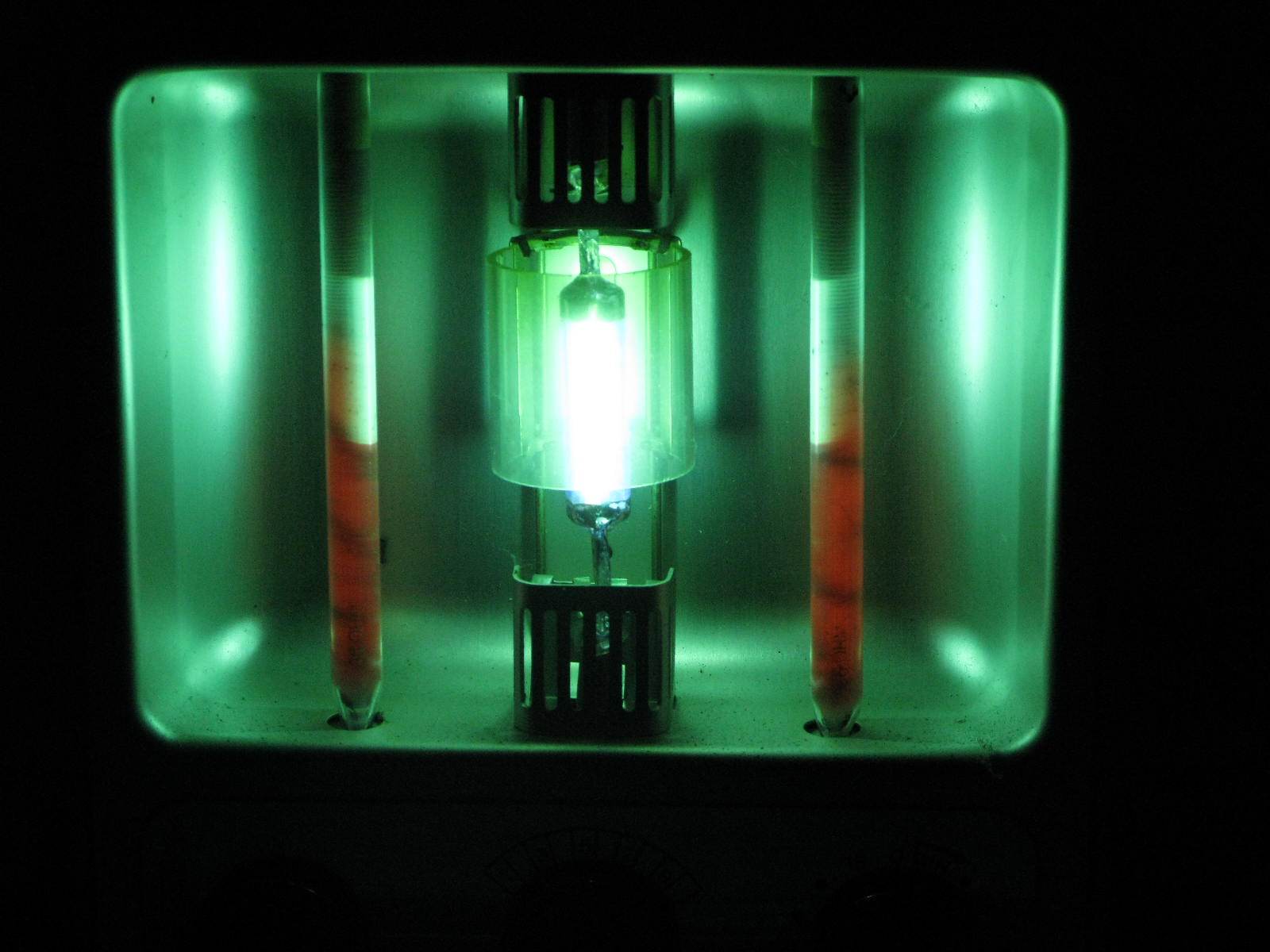
Skin tanner containing a low-pressure mercury vapor lamp and two infrared lamps, which act both as light source and electrical ballast

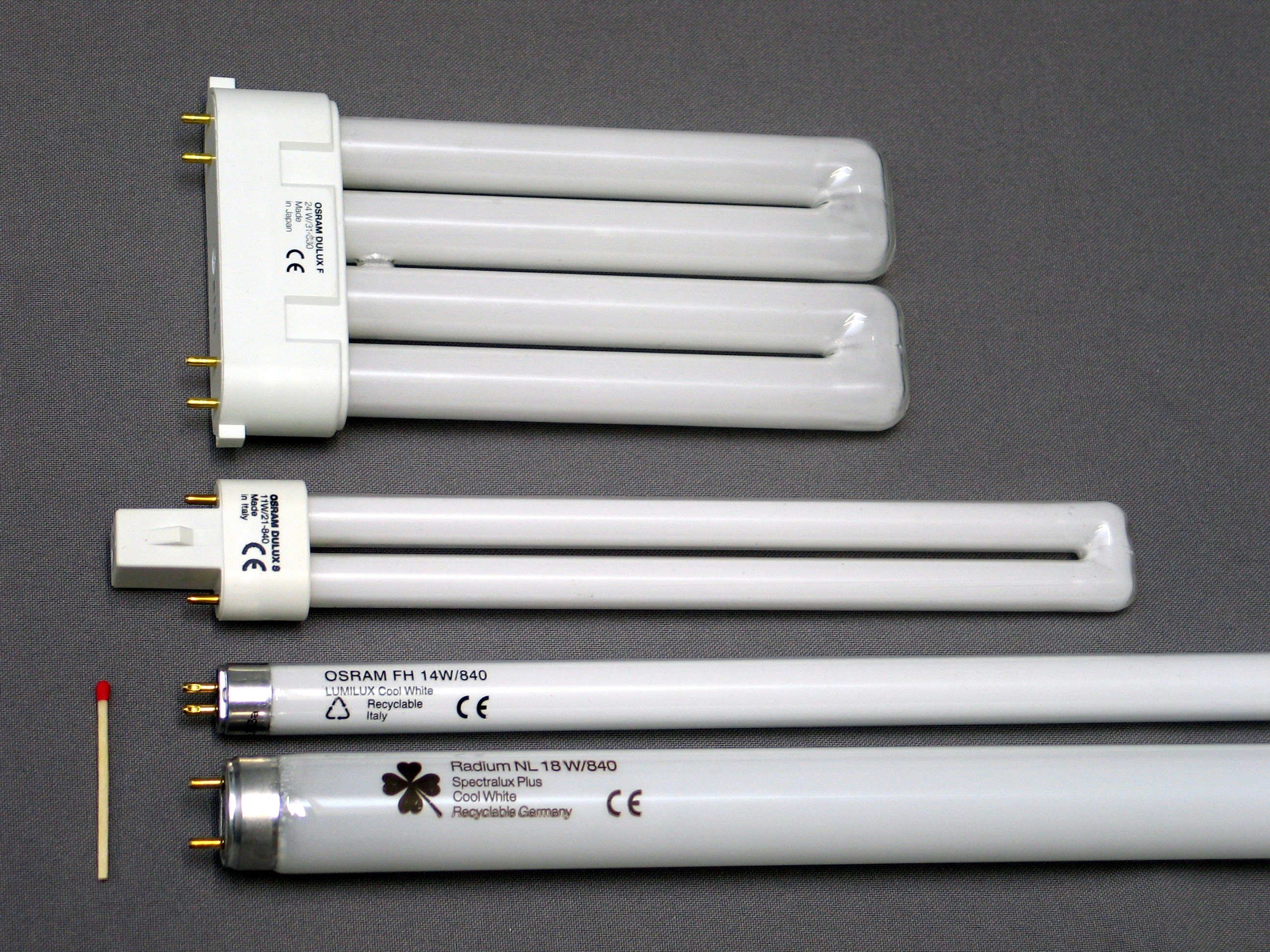
Assorted types of fluorescent lamps.

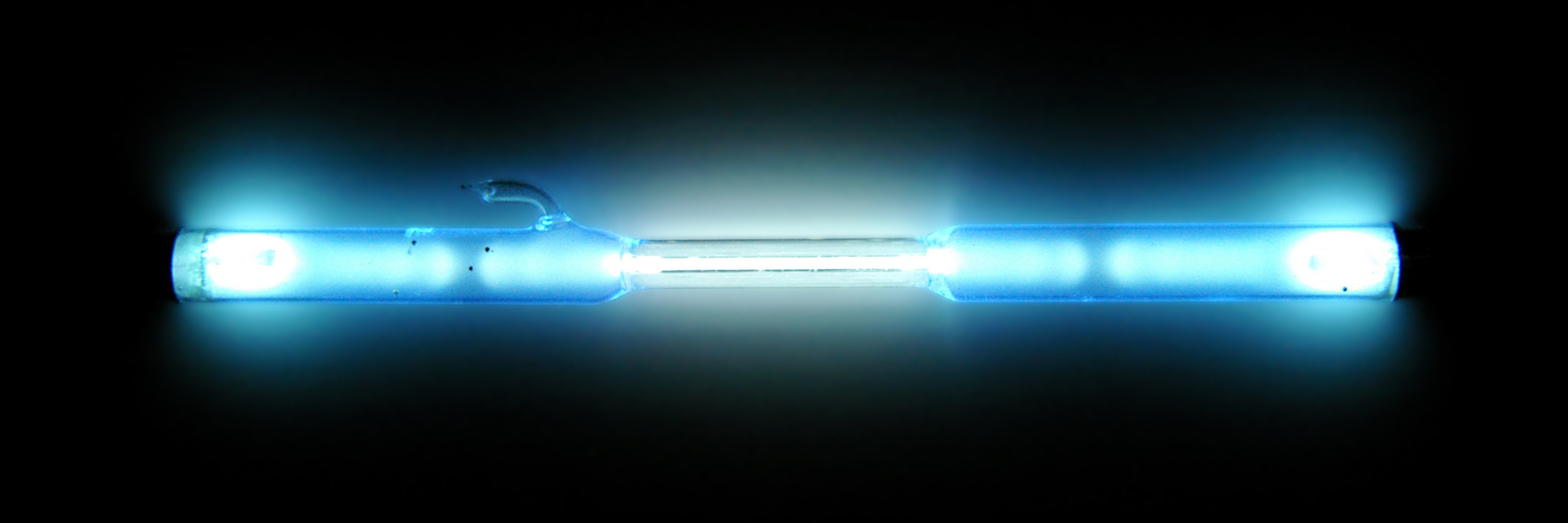
Mercury-discharge spectral calibration lamp.

=== Electrochemistry ===
Liquid mercury is part of a popular secondary reference electrode (called the calomel electrode) in electrochemistry as an alternative to the standard hydrogen electrode. The calomel electrode is used to work out the electrode potential of half cells. The triple point of mercury, −38.8344 °C, is a fixed point used as a temperature standard for the International Temperature Scale (ITS-90).

The mercury battery is a non-rechargeable electrochemical battery, a primary cell, that was common in the middle of the 20th century. It was used in a wide variety of applications and was available in various sizes, particularly button sizes. Its constant voltage output and long shelf life gave it a niche use for camera light meters and hearing aids. The mercury cell was effectively banned in most countries in the 1990s due to concerns about the mercury contaminating landfills.

=== Electromechanical ===
As an electrically conductive liquid, it was used in mercury switches (including home mercury light switches installed prior to 1970), tilt switches used in old fire detectors and in some home thermostats. Owing to its acoustic properties, mercury was used as the propagation medium in delay-line memory devices used in early digital computers of the mid-20th century, such as the UNIVAC I and SEAC.

Mercury was a propellant for early ion engines in electric space propulsion systems. Advantages were mercury's high molecular weight, low ionization energy, low dual-ionization energy, high liquid density and liquid storability at room temperature. Disadvantages were concerns regarding environmental impact associated with ground testing and concerns about eventual cooling and condensation of some of the propellant on the spacecraft in long-duration operations. The first spaceflight to use electric propulsion was a mercury-fueled ion thruster developed at NASA Glenn Research Center and flown on the Space Electric Rocket Test "SERT-1" spacecraft launched by NASA at its Wallops Flight Facility in 1964. The SERT-1 flight was followed up by the SERT-2 flight in 1970. Mercury and caesium were preferred propellants for ion engines until Hughes Research Laboratory performed studies finding xenon gas to be a suitable replacement. Xenon is now the preferred propellant for ion engines, as it has a high molecular weight, little or no reactivity due to its noble gas nature, and high liquid density under mild cryogenic storage.

The Deep Space Atomic Clock (DSAC) under development by the Jet Propulsion Laboratory utilises mercury in a linear ion-trap-based clock. The novel use of mercury permits the creation of compact atomic clocks with low energy requirements ideal for space probes and Mars missions.

In polarography, both the dropping mercury electrode and the hanging mercury drop electrode use elemental mercury. This use allows a new uncontaminated electrode to be available for each measurement or each new experiment.

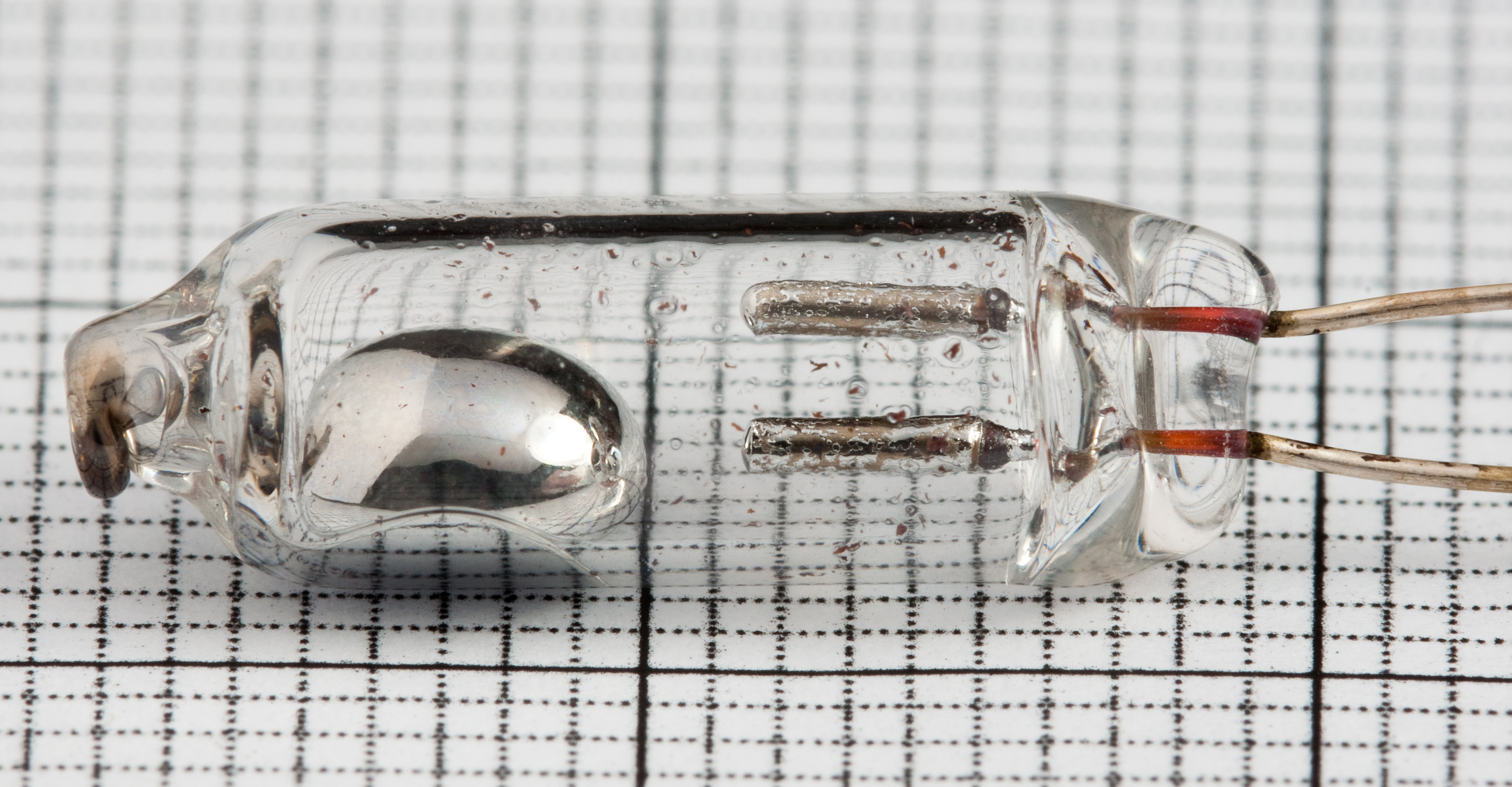
A single-pole, single-throw (SPST) mercury switch.

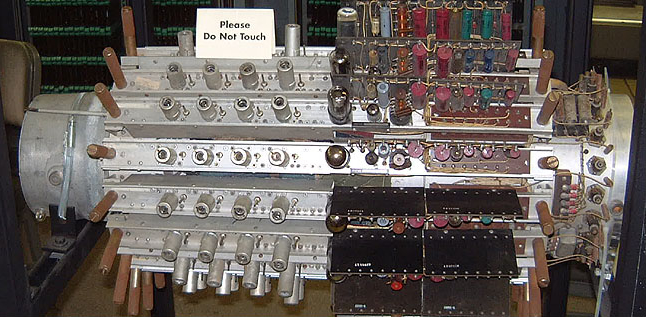
Mercury memory of UNIVAC I (1951).

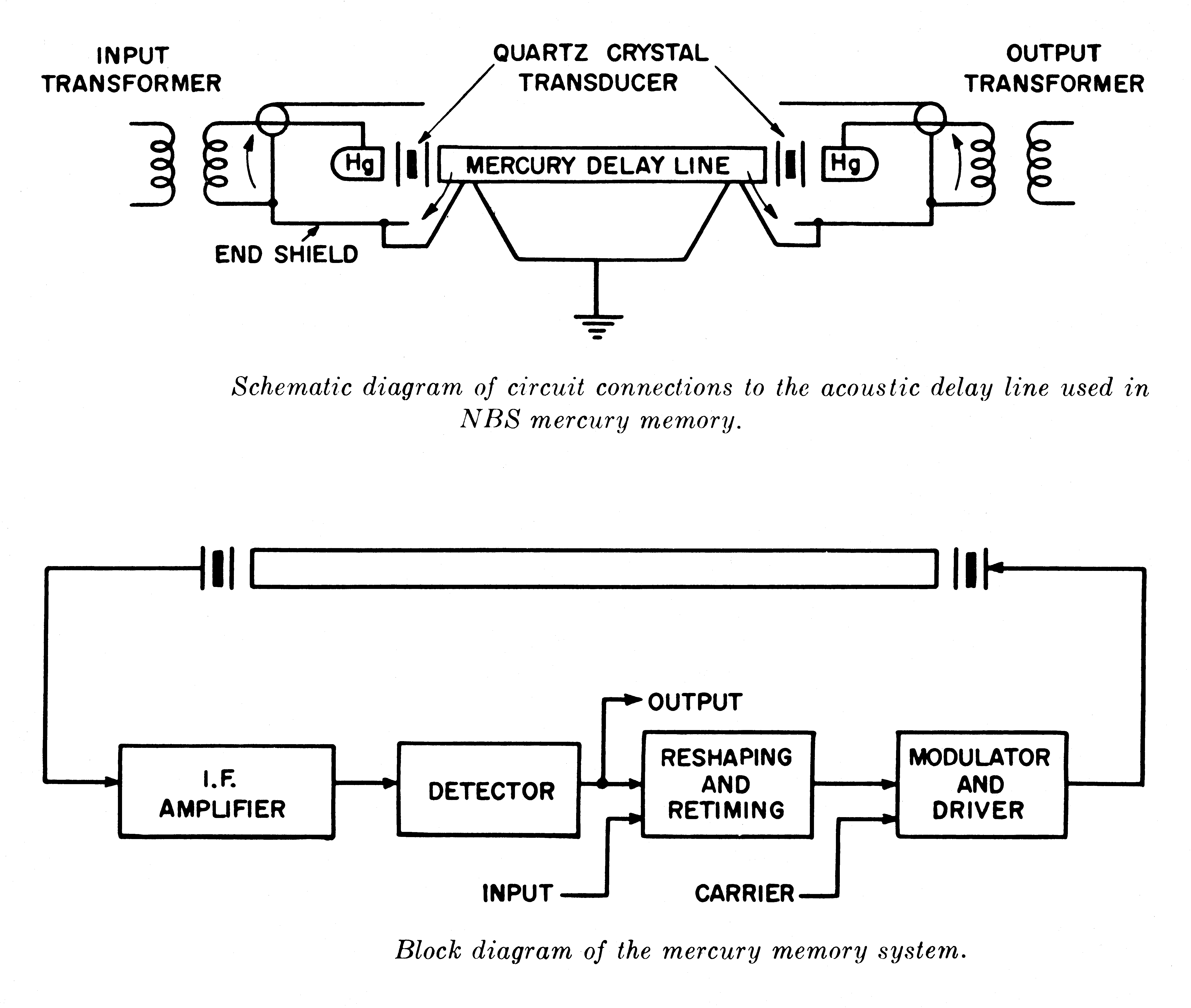
Diagram of mercury delay line as used in SEAC computer.

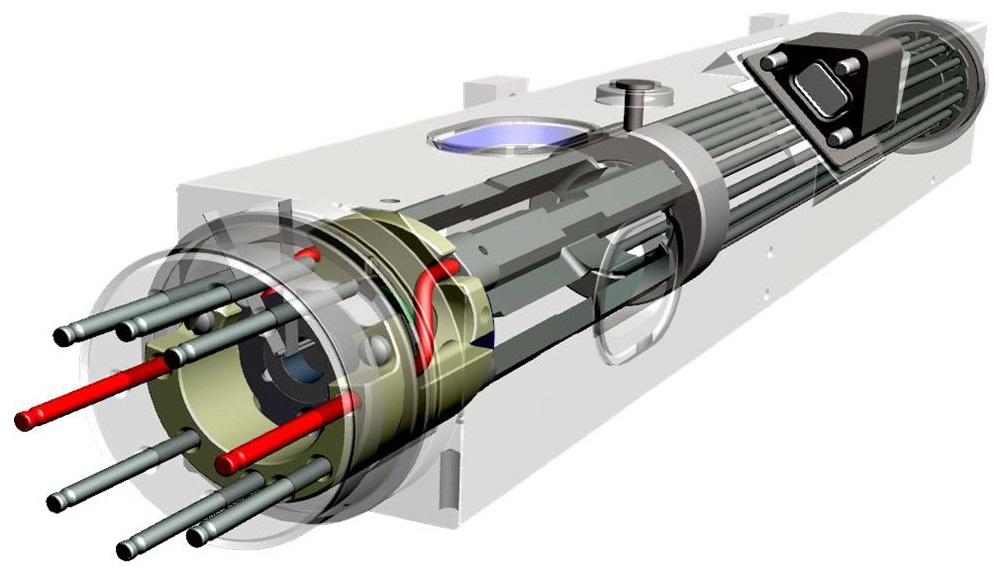
The miniaturized Deep Space Atomic Clock is a linear ion-trap-based mercury ion clock, designed for precise and real-time radio navigation in deep space.

=== Mirrors ===
Some transit telescopes use a basin of mercury to form a flat and absolutely horizontal mirror, useful in determining an absolute vertical or perpendicular reference. Concave horizontal parabolic mirrors may be formed by rotating liquid mercury on a disk, the parabolic form of the liquid thus formed reflecting and focusing incident light. Such liquid-mirror telescopes are cheaper than conventional large mirror telescopes by up to a factor of 100, but the mirror cannot be tilted and always points straight up. The Fresnel lenses of old lighthouses used to float and rotate in a bath of mercury which acted like a bearing.

=== Energy generation ===
Experimental mercury vapor turbines were installed to increase the efficiency of fossil-fuel electrical power plants. The South Meadow power plant in Hartford, CT employed mercury as its working fluid, in a binary configuration with a secondary water circuit, for a number of years starting in the late 1920s in a drive to improve plant efficiency. Several other plants were built, including the Schiller Station in Portsmouth, NH, which went online in 1950. The idea did not catch on industry-wide due to the weight and toxicity of mercury, as well as the advent of supercritical steam plants in later years. Similarly, liquid mercury was used as a coolant for some nuclear reactors; however, sodium is proposed for liquid metal cooled reactor, because the high density of mercury requires much more energy to circulate as coolant.

=== Production of chlorine and caustic soda ===
Chlorine is produced from sodium chloride (common salt, NaCl) using electrolysis to separate metallic sodium from chlorine gas. Usually salt is dissolved in water to produce a brine. By-products of any such chloralkali process are hydrogen (H_{2}) and sodium hydroxide (NaOH), which is commonly called caustic soda or lye. By far the largest use of mercury in the late 20th century was in the mercury cell process (also called the Castner-Kellner process) where metallic sodium is formed as an amalgam at a cathode made from mercury; this sodium is then reacted with water to produce sodium hydroxide. Many of the industrial mercury releases of the 20th century came from this process, although modern plants claim to be safe in this regard. From the 1960s onward, the majority of industrial plants moved away from mercury cell processes towards diaphragm cell technologies to produce chlorine, though 11% of the chlorine made in the United States was still produced with the mercury cell method as of 2005.

=== Mining ===
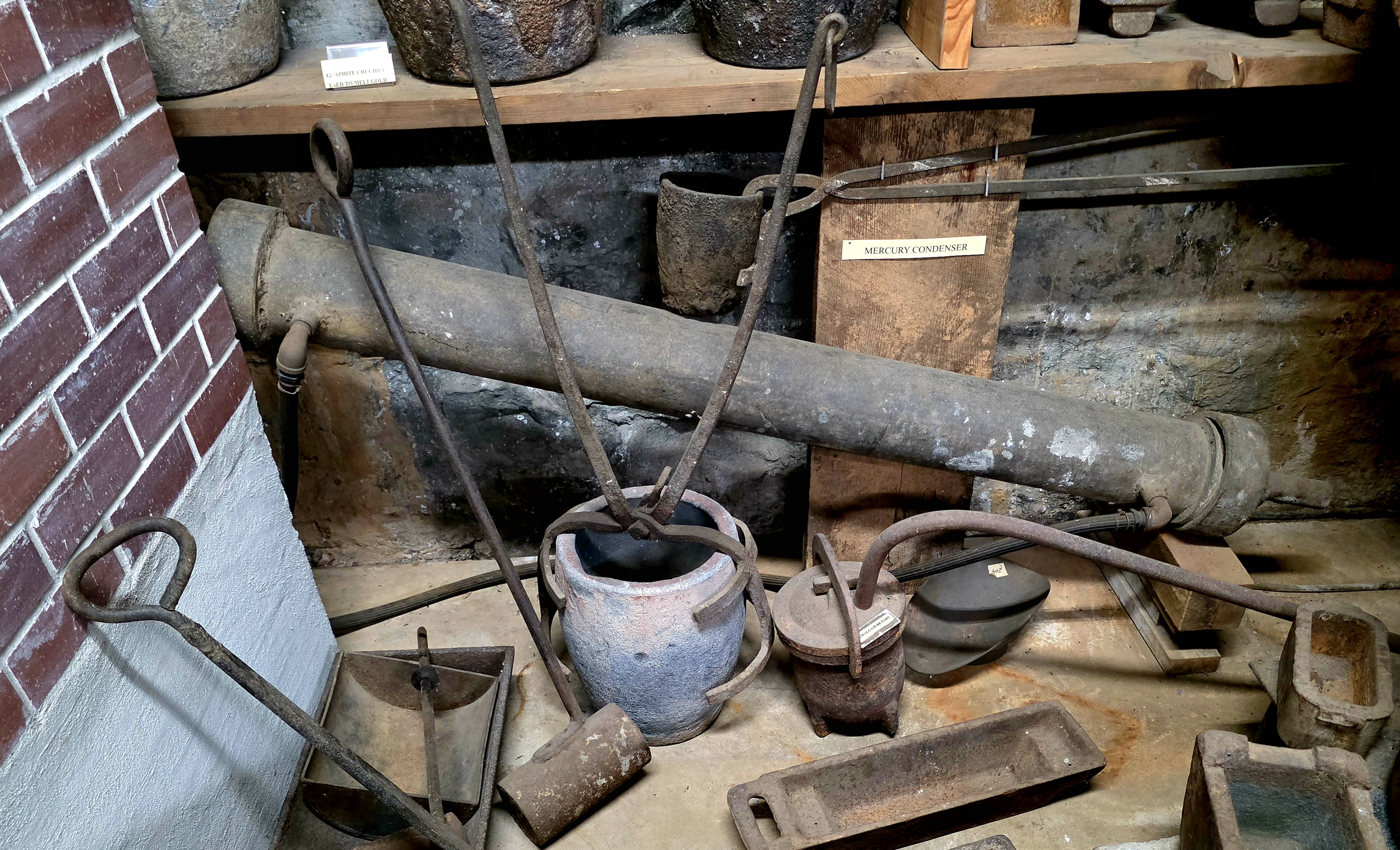
Water cooled mercury condenser used in gold mining to recover and recycle the mercury

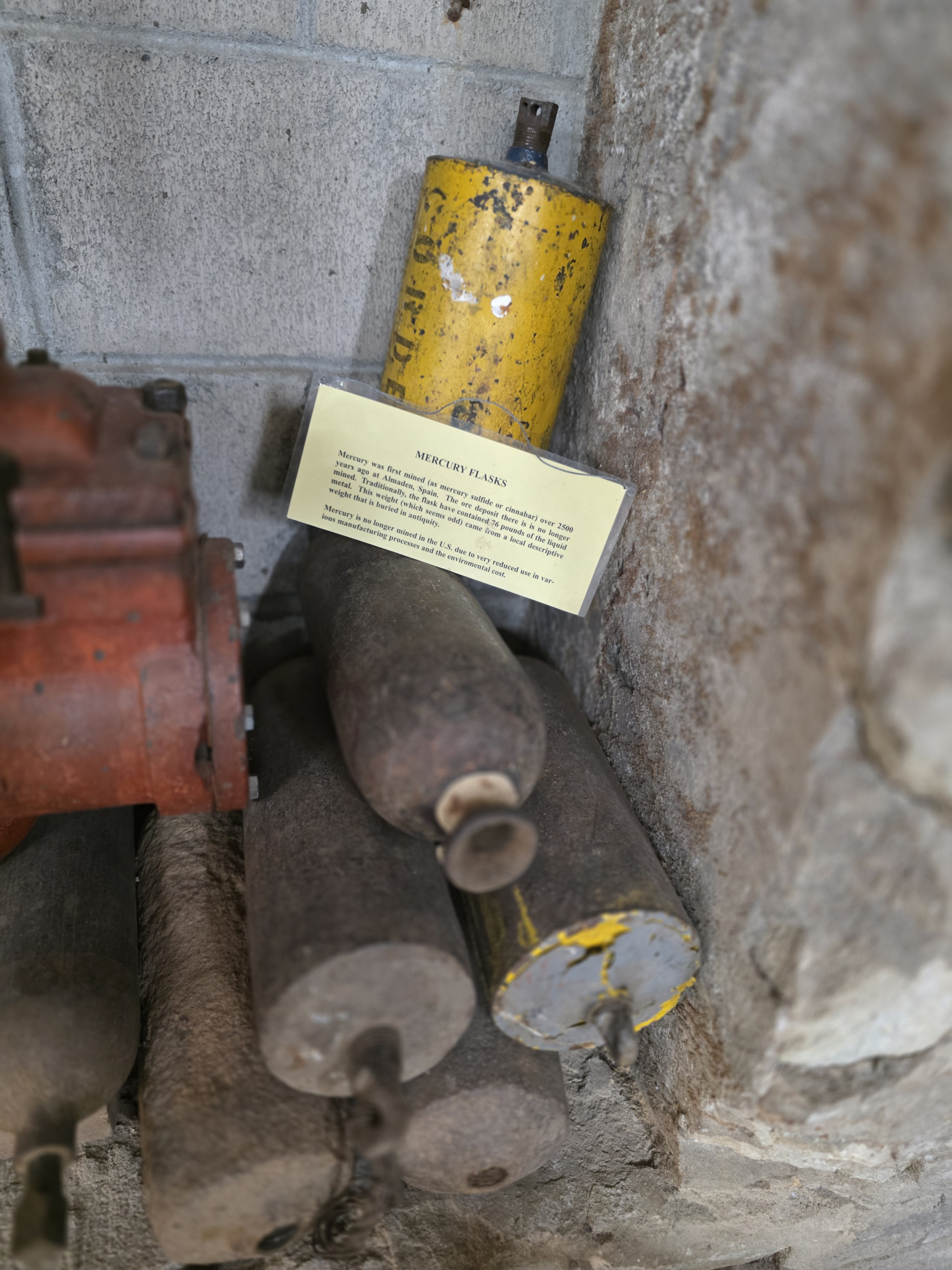
Mercury flasks used in gold mines

Historically, mercury was used extensively in hydraulic gold mining and Quartz reef mining. Large-scale use of mercury stopped in the 1960s. However, mercury is still used in small scale, often illegal, gold prospecting where it can help separate gold particles from a mixture of sand or gravel and water. Small gold particles may form mercury-gold amalgam and therefore increase the gold recovery rates. The use of mercury causes a severe pollution problem in places such as Ghana. It is estimated that 45,000 metric tons of mercury used in California for placer mining have not been recovered. Mercury was also used in silver mining to extract the metal from ore through the patio process.

=== Firearms ===
Mercury(II) fulminate is a primary explosive, which has mainly been used as a primer of a cartridge in firearms throughout the 19th and 20th centuries. Mercury was once used as a gun barrel bore cleaner.

=== Structural biology ===
Mercury-containing compounds are also of use in the field of structural biology. Mercuric compounds such as mercury(II) chloride or potassium tetraiodomercurate(II) can be added to protein crystals in an effort to create heavy atom derivatives that can be used to solve the phase problem in X-ray crystallography via isomorphous replacement or anomalous scattering methods.

== Toxicity and safety ==
Mercury
Hazards
- GHS labelling
Pictograms	(GHS06: Toxic) (GHS08: Health hazard) (GHS09: Environmental hazard)
Signal word	Danger
Hazard statements	H330, H360D, H372, H410
Precautionary statements	P201, P233, P260, P273, P280, P304, P308, P310, P313, P340, P391, P403
NFPA 704 (fire diamond)	2 0 0

Due to its physical properties and relative chemical inertness, liquid mercury is absorbed very poorly through intact skin and the gastrointestinal tract. Mercury vapor is the primary hazard of elemental mercury. As a result, containers of mercury are securely sealed to avoid spills and evaporation. Heating of mercury, or of compounds of mercury that may decompose when heated, should be carried out with adequate ventilation in order to minimize exposure to mercury vapor. The most toxic forms of mercury are its organic compounds, such as dimethylmercury and methylmercury. Mercury can cause both chronic and acute poisoning.

=== Releases in the environment ===
Amount of atmospheric mercury deposited at Wyoming's Upper Fremont Glacier over the last 270 years

Preindustrial mercury concentration in ice unaffected by volcano activity was between 1 to 4 ng per liter. Volcanic eruptions and related natural sources are responsible for approximately half of atmospheric mercury emissions.

Atmospheric mercury contamination in outdoor urban air at the start of the 21st century was measured at 0.01–0.02 μg/m^{3}. A 2001 study measured mercury levels in 12 indoor sites chosen to represent a cross-section of building types, locations and ages in the New York area. This study found mercury concentrations significantly elevated over outdoor concentrations, at a range of 0.0065 – 0.523 μg/m^{3}. The average was 0.069 μg/m^{3}.

Half of mercury emissions are attributed to mankind. The sources in 2000 can be divided into the following estimated percentages:

- 65% from stationary combustion, of which coal-fired power plants are the largest aggregate source (40% of U.S. mercury emissions in 1999). This includes power plants fueled with gas where the mercury has not been removed. Emissions from coal combustion are between one and two orders of magnitude higher than emissions from oil combustion, depending on the country.
- 11% from gold production. The three largest point sources for mercury emissions in the U.S. are the three largest gold mines. Hydrogeochemical release of mercury from gold-mine tailings has been accounted as a significant source of atmospheric mercury in eastern Canada.
- 6.8% from non-ferrous metal production, typically smelters.
- 6.4% from cement production.
- 3.0% from waste disposal, including municipal and hazardous waste, crematoria, and sewage sludge incineration.
- 3.0% from caustic soda production.
- 1.4% from pig iron and steel production.
- 1.1% from mercury production, mainly for batteries.
- 2.0% from other sources.

The above percentages are estimates of the global human-caused mercury emissions, excluding biomass burning, an important source in some regions. In 2024, aerial mercury emissions from cremation in England were the second-largest source after fuel combustion.

A serious industrial disaster was the dumping of waste mercury compounds into Minamata Bay, Japan, between 1932 and 1968. It is estimated that over 3,000 people suffered various deformities, severe mercury poisoning symptoms or death from what became known as Minamata disease.

China is estimated to produce 50% of mercury emissions, most of which result from production of vinyl chloride.

Joss paper burning on the street, a common tradition practiced in Asia, Hong Kong, 2023

Mercury also enters into the environment through the improper disposal of mercury-containing products. Due to health concerns, toxics use reduction efforts are cutting back or eliminating mercury in such products. For example, the amount of mercury sold in thermostats in the United States decreased from 14.5 tons in 2004 to 3.9 tons in 2007.

The tobacco plant readily absorbs and accumulates heavy metals such as mercury from the surrounding soil into its leaves. These are subsequently inhaled during tobacco smoking. While mercury is a constituent of tobacco smoke, studies have largely failed to discover a significant correlation between smoking and mercury uptake by humans compared to sources such as occupational exposure, fish consumption, and amalgam tooth fillings.

A less well-known source of mercury is the burning of joss paper, which is a common tradition practiced in Asia, including China, Vietnam, Hong Kong, Thailand, Taiwan and Malaysia.

==== Spill cleanup ====
Mercury spills pose an immediate threat to people handling the material, in addition to being an environmental hazard if the material is not contained properly. This is of particular concern for visible mercury, or mercury in liquid state, as its unusual appearance and behavior for a metal makes it an attractive nuisance to the uninformed. Procedures have been developed to contain mercury spills, as well as recommendations on appropriate responses based on the conditions of a spill. Tracking liquid mercury away from the site of a spill is a major concern in liquid mercury spills; regulations emphasize containment of the visible mercury as the first course of action, followed by monitoring of mercury vapors and vapor cleanup. Several products are sold as mercury spill adsorbents, ranging from metal salts to polymers and zeolites.

=== Sediment contamination ===
Sediments within large urban-industrial estuaries act as an important sink for point source and diffuse mercury pollution within catchments. A 2015 study of foreshore sediments from the Thames estuary measured total mercury at 0.01 to 12.07 mg/kg with mean of 2.10 mg/kg and median of 0.85 mg/kg (n = 351). The highest mercury concentrations were shown to occur in and around the city of London in association with fine grain muds and high total organic carbon content. The strong affinity of mercury for carbon rich sediments has also been observed in salt marsh sediments of the River Mersey, with a mean concentration of 2 mg/kg, up to 5 mg/kg. These concentrations are far higher than those in the salt marsh river creek sediments of New Jersey and mangroves of Southern China, which exhibit low mercury concentrations of about 0.2 mg/kg.

=== Occupational exposure ===
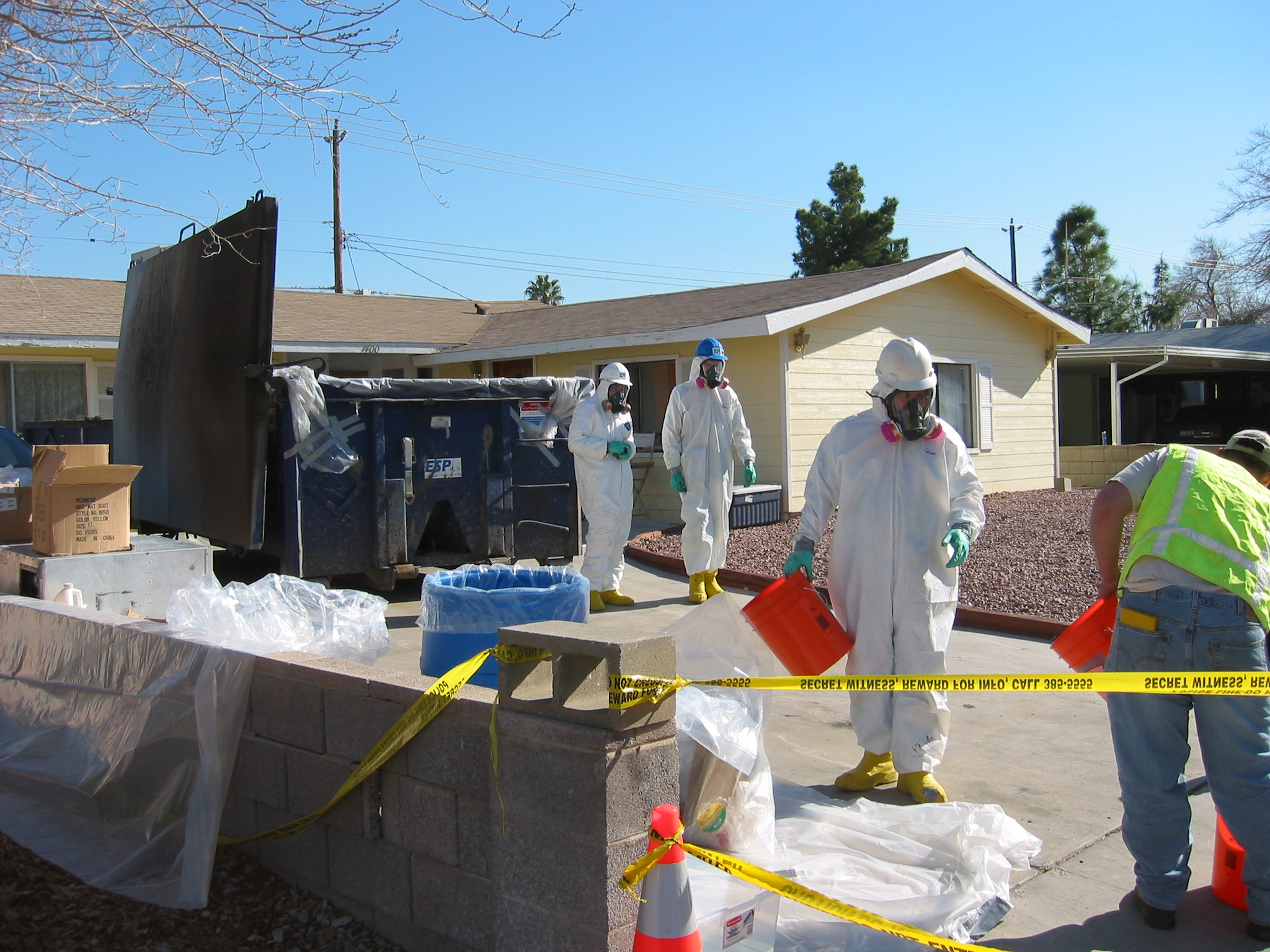
EPA workers clean up residential mercury spill in 2004

Due to the health effects of mercury exposure, industrial and commercial uses are regulated in many countries. The World Health Organization, OSHA, and NIOSH all treat mercury as an occupational hazard; both OSHA and NIOSH, among other regulatory agencies, have established specific occupational exposure limits on the element and its derivative compounds in liquid and vapor form. Environmental releases and disposal of mercury are regulated in the U.S. primarily by the United States Environmental Protection Agency.

=== Fish ===
Fish and shellfish have a natural tendency to concentrate mercury in their bodies, often in the form of methylmercury, a highly toxic organic compound of mercury. Species of fish that are high on the food chain, such as shark, swordfish, king mackerel, bluefin tuna, albacore tuna, and tilefish contain higher concentrations of mercury than others. Because mercury and methylmercury are fat soluble, they primarily accumulate in the viscera, although they are also found throughout the muscle tissue. Mercury presence in fish muscles can be studied using non-lethal muscle biopsies. Mercury present in prey fish accumulates in the predator that consumes them. Since fish are less efficient at depurating than accumulating methylmercury, methylmercury concentrations in the fish tissue increase over time. Thus species that are high on the food chain amass body burdens of mercury that can be ten times higher than the species they consume. This process is called biomagnification. Mercury poisoning happened this way in Minamata, Japan, now called Minamata disease.

=== Cosmetics ===
Some facial creams contain dangerous levels of mercury. Most contain comparatively non-toxic inorganic mercury, but products containing highly toxic organic mercury have been encountered. New York City residents have been found to be exposed to significant levels of inorganic mercury compounds through the use of skin care products.

=== Effects and symptoms of mercury poisoning ===
Toxic effects include damage to the brain, kidneys and lungs. Mercury poisoning can result in several diseases, including acrodynia (pink disease), Hunter-Russell syndrome, and Minamata disease. Symptoms typically include sensory impairment (vision, hearing, speech), disturbed sensation and a lack of coordination. The type and degree of symptoms exhibited depend upon the individual toxin, the dose, and the method and duration of exposure. Case–control studies have shown effects such as tremors, impaired cognitive skills, and sleep disturbance in workers with chronic exposure to mercury vapor even at low concentrations in the range 0.7–42 μg/m^{3}.

A study has shown that acute exposure (4–8 hours) to calculated elemental mercury levels of 1.1 to 44 mg/m^{3} resulted in chest pain, dyspnea, cough, hemoptysis, impairment of pulmonary function, and evidence of interstitial pneumonitis. Acute exposure to mercury vapor has been shown to result in profound central nervous system effects, including psychotic reactions characterized by delirium, hallucinations, and suicidal tendency. Occupational exposure has resulted in broad-ranging functional disturbance, including erethism, irritability, excitability, excessive shyness, and insomnia. With continuing exposure, a fine tremor develops and may escalate to violent muscular spasms. Tremor initially involves the hands and later spreads to the eyelids, lips, and tongue. Long-term, low-level exposure has been associated with more subtle symptoms of erethism, including fatigue, irritability, loss of memory, vivid dreams and depression.

=== Treatment ===
Research on the treatment of mercury poisoning is limited. Currently available drugs for acute mercurial poisoning include chelators N-acetyl-D,L-penicillamine (NAP), British Anti-Lewisite (BAL), 2,3-dimercapto-1-propanesulfonic acid (DMPS), and dimercaptosuccinic acid (DMSA). In one small study including 11 construction workers exposed to elemental mercury, patients were treated with DMSA and NAP. Chelation therapy with both drugs resulted in the mobilization of a small fraction of the total estimated body mercury. DMSA was able to increase the excretion of mercury to a greater extent than NAP.

== Regulations ==
=== International ===
140 countries agreed in the Minamata Convention on Mercury by the United Nations Environment Programme (UNEP) to prevent mercury vapor emissions. The convention was signed on 10 October 2013.

=== United States ===
In the United States, the Environmental Protection Agency is charged with regulating and managing mercury contamination. Several laws give the EPA this authority, including the Clean Air Act, the Clean Water Act, the Resource Conservation and Recovery Act, and the Safe Drinking Water Act. Additionally, the Mercury-Containing and Rechargeable Battery Management Act, passed in 1996, phases out the use of mercury in batteries, and provides for the efficient and cost-effective disposal of many types of used batteries. North America contributed approximately 11% of the total global anthropogenic mercury emissions in 1995.

The United States Clean Air Act, passed in 1990, put mercury on a list of toxic pollutants that need to be controlled to the greatest possible extent. Thus, industries that release high concentrations of mercury into the environment agreed to install maximum achievable control technologies (MACT). In March 2005, the EPA promulgated a regulation that added power plants to the list of sources that should be controlled and instituted a national cap and trade system. States were given until November 2006 to impose stricter controls, but after a legal challenge from several states, the regulations were struck down by a federal appeals court on 8 February 2008. The rule was deemed not sufficient to protect the health of persons living near coal-fired power plants, given the negative effects documented in the EPA Study Report to Congress of 1998. However newer data published in 2015 showed that after introduction of the stricter controls mercury declined sharply, indicating that the Clean Air Act had its intended impact.

The EPA announced new rules for coal-fired power plants on 22 December 2011. Cement kilns that burn hazardous waste are held to a looser standard than are standard hazardous waste incinerators in the United States, and as a result are a disproportionate source of mercury pollution.

=== European Union ===
In the European Union, the directive on the Restriction of the Use of Certain Hazardous Substances in Electrical and Electronic Equipment (see RoHS) bans mercury from certain electrical and electronic products, and limits the amount of mercury in other products to less than 1000 ppm. There are restrictions for mercury concentration in packaging (the limit is 100 ppm for sum of mercury, lead, hexavalent chromium and cadmium) and batteries (the limit is 5 ppm). In July 2007, the European Union also banned mercury in non-electrical measuring devices, such as thermometers and barometers. The ban applies to new devices only, and contains exemptions for the health care sector and a two-year grace period for manufacturers of barometers.

=== Scandinavia ===
Norway enacted a total ban on the use of mercury in the manufacturing and import/export of mercury products, effective 1 January 2008. In 2002, several lakes in Norway were found to have a poor state of mercury pollution, with an excess of 1 μg/g of mercury in their sediment. In 2008, Norway's Minister of Environment Development Erik Solheim said: "Mercury is among the most dangerous environmental toxins. Satisfactory alternatives to Hg in products are available, and it is therefore fitting to induce a ban." Products containing mercury were banned in Sweden in 2009, while elemental mercury has been banned from manufacture and use in all but a few applications (such as certain energy-saving light sources and amalgam dental fillings) in Denmark since 2008.

== See also ==
- Mercury (disambiguation) for other uses of the name
- COLEX process (isotopic separation)
- Mercury pollution in the ocean
- Red mercury
- Barometric light
