= C5H11NO2S =

The molecular formula C_{5}H_{11}NO_{2}S (molar mass: 149.21 g/mol, exact mass: 149.0510 u) may refer to:

- Methionine, an essential amino acid in humans
- Penicillamine, a medication
