= Dimercaprol =

Antidote for certain metal poisonings

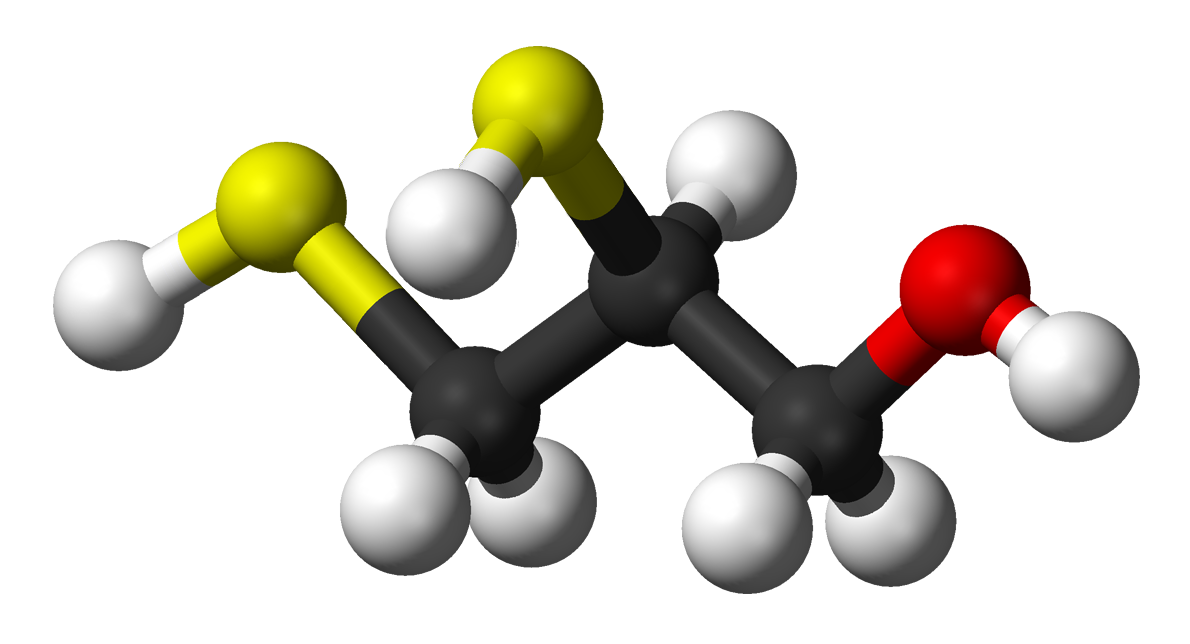
- Skeletal formula and ball and stick model of dimercaprol

Clinical data
- Trade names: BAL in Oil
- Other names: 2,3-Dimercaptopropanol; British Anti-Lewisite; 2,3-Dithiopropanol; 2,3-Dimercaptopropan-1-ol; British antilewisite
- AHFS/Drugs.com: Monograph
- License data: US DailyMed: Dimercaprol
- Routes of administration: intramuscular
- ATC code: V03AB09 (WHO)

Legal status
- Legal status: US: ℞-only

Pharmacokinetic data
- Excretion: Urine

Identifiers
- IUPAC name: 2,3-Bis(sulfanyl)propan-1-ol
- CAS Number: 59-52-9
- PubChem CID: 3080
- DrugBank: DB06782
- ChemSpider: 2971
- UNII: 0CPP32S55X
- KEGG: D00167
- ChEMBL: ChEMBL1597
- CompTox Dashboard (EPA): DTXSID5040461
- ECHA InfoCard: 100.000.394

Chemical and physical data
- Formula: C_{3}H_{8}OS_{2}
- Molar mass: 124.22 g·mol^{−1}
- 3D model (JSmol): Interactive image
- Density: 1.239 g/cm^{3}
- Boiling point: 393 °C (739 °F) at 2.0 kPa
- SMILES: OCC(S)CS
- InChI: InChI=1S/C3H8OS2/c4-1-3(6)2-5/h3-6H,1-2H2; Key:WQABCVAJNWAXTE-UHFFFAOYSA-N

Dimercaprol, also called British anti-Lewisite (BAL), is a medication chelator used to treat acute poisoning by arsenic, mercury, gold, and lead. It may also be used for antimony, thallium, or bismuth poisoning, although the evidence for those uses is not very strong. It is given by injection into a muscle.

Common side effects include high blood pressure, pain at the site of the injection, vomiting, and fever. It is not recommended for people with peanut allergies as it is typically formulated as a suspension in peanut oil. It is unclear if use in pregnancy is safe for the baby. Dimercaprol is a chelator and works by binding with heavy metals. It has a very pungent odor.

Dimercaprol was first made during World War II. It is on the World Health Organization's List of Essential Medicines.

== Medical uses ==
Dimercaprol has long been the mainstay of chelation therapy for lead or arsenic poisoning, and it is an essential drug. It is also used as an antidote to the organometallic chemical weapon Lewisite. Nonetheless, because it can have serious adverse effects, researchers have also pursued development of less toxic analogues, such as succimer.

Wilson's disease is a genetic disorder in which copper builds up inside the liver and other tissues. Dimercaprol is a copper chelating agent that has been approved by the FDA to treat Wilson's disease.

Dimercaprol also shows effectiveness against snakebite by chelating the zinc ions needed for the activity of snake venom metalloproteinases in vitro.

== Mechanism of action ==
Arsenic and some other heavy metals act by chelating with adjacent thiol residues on metabolic enzymes, creating a chelate complex that inhibits the affected enzyme's activity. Dimercaprol competes with the thiol groups for binding the metal ion, which is then excreted in the urine.

Dimercaprol is itself toxic, with a narrow therapeutic range and a tendency to concentrate arsenic in some organs. Other drawbacks include the need to administer it by painful intramuscular injection. Serious side effects include nephrotoxicity and hypertension.

Dimercaprol has been found to form stable chelates in vivo with many other metals including inorganic mercury, antimony, bismuth, cadmium, chromium, cobalt, gold, and nickel. However, it is not necessarily the treatment of choice for toxicity to these metals. Dimercaprol has been used as an adjunct in the treatment of the acute encephalopathy of lead toxicity. It is a potentially toxic drug, and its use may be accompanied by multiple side effects. Although treatment with dimercaprol will increase the urinary excretion of cadmium, use in case of cadmium toxicity is to be avoided as the drug-cadmium complex is rather nephrotoxic. It does, however, remove inorganic mercury from the kidneys; Dimercaprol should not be used to treat organomercury poisoning. Dimercaprol also enhances the toxicity of selenium and tellurium, so it is not to be used to remove these elements from the body.

== History ==
The original name of dimercaprol reflects its origins as a compound secretly developed by British biochemists at Oxford University in the beginning of the World War II, with the first synthesis in July 1940 as an antidote for lewisite, a now-obsolete organoarsenic chemical warfare agent.

== See also ==
- 2,3-Dimercapto-1-propanesulfonic acid
- Dimercaptosuccinic acid
- DMSA scan
- EDTA
- Heavy metal poisoning
- Penicillamine
