= Chelation therapy =

Medical procedure to remove heavy metals from the body

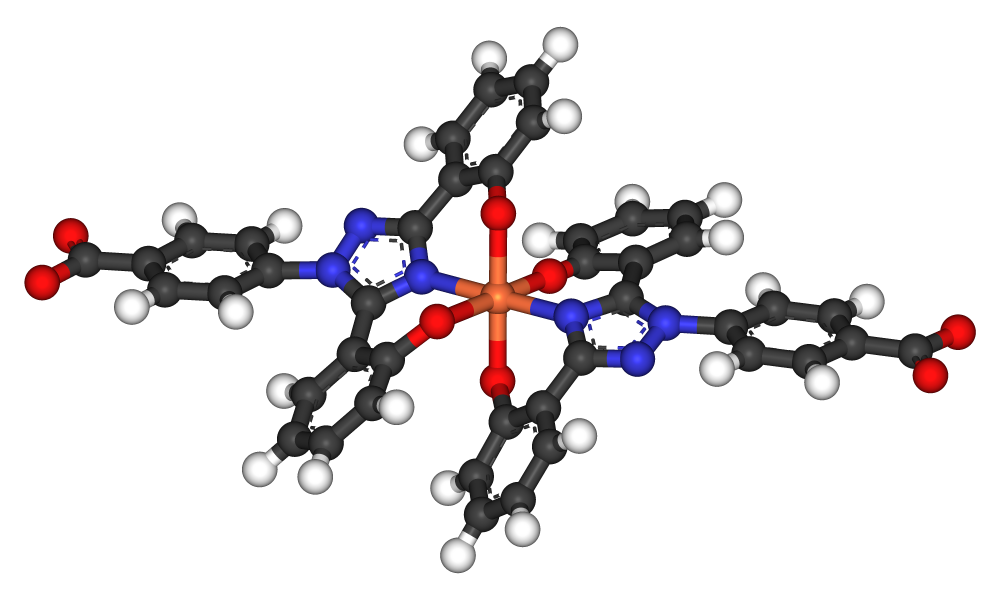
- Two molecules of deferasirox, an orally administered chelator, binding iron. Deferasirox is used in the treatment of transfusional iron overload in people with thalassemia.

Chelation therapy is a medical procedure that involves the administration of chelating agents to remove heavy metals from the body. Chelation therapy has a long history of use in clinical toxicology and remains in use for some very specific medical treatments, although it is administered under very careful medical supervision due to various inherent risks, including the mobilization of mercury and other metals through the brain and other parts of the body by the use of weak chelating agents that unbind with metals before elimination, exacerbating existing damage. To avoid mobilization, some practitioners of chelation use strong chelators, such as selenium, taken at low doses over a long period of time.

Chelation therapy also has a history of fraudulent use in alternative medicine, to treat claimed effects of heavy-metal exposure on problems as disparate as heart disease, cancer, and autism.

Chelation therapy must be administered with care as it has a number of possible side effects, including death. In response to increasing use of chelation therapy as alternative medicine and in circumstances in which the therapy should not be used in conventional medicine, various health organizations have confirmed that medical evidence does not support the effectiveness of chelation therapy for any purpose other than the treatment of heavy metal poisoning. Over-the-counter chelation products are not approved for sale in the United States.

== Medical uses ==
Chelation therapy is the preferred medical treatment for metal poisoning, including acute mercury, iron (including in cases of sickle-cell disease and thalassemia), arsenic, lead, uranium, plutonium and other forms of toxic metal poisoning. The chelating agent may be administered intravenously, intramuscularly, or orally, depending on the agent and the type of poisoning.

=== Chelating agents ===
There are a variety of common chelating agents with differing affinities for different metals, physical characteristics, and biological mechanism of action. For the most common forms of heavy metal intoxication – lead, arsenic, or mercury – a number of chelating agents are available. Dimercaptosuccinic acid (DMSA) has been recommended by poison control centers around the world for the treatment of lead poisoning in children. Other chelating agents, such as 2,3-dimercaptopropanesulfonic acid (DMPS) and alpha lipoic acid (ALA), are used in conventional and alternative medicine. Some common chelating agents are ethylenediaminetetraacetic acid (EDTA), 2,3-dimercaptopropanesulfonic acid (DMPS), and thiamine tetrahydrofurfuryl disulfide (TTFD). Calcium-disodium EDTA and DMSA are only approved for the removal of lead by the Food and Drug Administration while DMPS and TTFD are not approved by the FDA. These drugs bind to heavy metals in the body and prevent them from binding to other agents. They are then excreted from the body. The chelating process also removes vital nutrients such as vitamins C and E, therefore these must be supplemented.

The German Environmental Agency (Umweltbundesamt) listed DMSA and DMPS as the two most useful and safe chelating agents available.

Chelator	Used in
Ethylenediaminetetraacetic acid (EDTA)	early chelation-therapy research
Dimercaprol ("British anti-Lewisite", or BAL)	acute arsenic poisoning; acute mercury poisoning; lead poisoning (in addition to EDTA); Lewisite poisoning (for which it was developed as an antidote)
Dimercaptosuccinic acid (DMSA, "Succimer")	lead poisoning; arsenic poisoning; mercury poisoning
Dimercapto-propane sulfonate (DMPS, "Dimaval")	severe acute arsenic poisoning; severe acute mercury poisoning
Penicillamine	Mainly in: copper toxicity; Occasionally adjunctive therapy in: gold toxicity; arsenic poisoning; lead poisoning; rheumatoid arthritis
Ethylenediamine tetraacetic acid (calcium disodium versenate) (CaNa_{2}-EDTA)	lead poisoning
Deferoxamine, Deferasirox and Deferiprone	acute iron poisoning; iron overload

=== Side effects ===
Chelation therapy carries a range of potential side effects. When administered appropriately under medical supervision, side effects may include dehydration, hypocalcemia (low calcium levels), renal impairment, elevated liver enzymes, electrolyte imbalance, and allergic reactions. The loss of essential dietary elements such as zinc, magnesium, and iron is common, especially with prolonged therapy, potentially leading to fatigue, weakened immunity, or neurological disturbances.

In contrast, inappropriate or non-medical use for example, in unapproved treatments for autism or cardiovascular disease, has been associated with serious complications, including severe hypocalcemia, neurodevelopmental disorders, and even death. Notably, disodium EDTA had been linked to fatal outcomes when used incorrectly, such as through rapid IV administration. For these reasons, regulating authorities like FDA, CDC strongly discourage off label or unsupervised use of chelation agents.

== Use in alternative medicine ==
In alternative medicine, some practitioners claim chelation therapy can treat a variety of ailments, including heart disease and autism. There has been scientific evidence that chelation therapy for heart disease is modestly successful. However, there is no proof that chelation therapy is effective for behavioral disorders such as autism. Chelation therapy prior to heavy metal testing can artificially raise urinary heavy metal concentrations ("provoked" urine testing) and lead to inappropriate and unnecessary treatment. The American College of Medical Toxicology and the American Academy of Clinical Toxicology warn the public that chelating drugs used in chelation therapy may have serious side effects, including liver and kidney damage, blood pressure changes, allergies and in some cases even death of the patient.

=== Cancer ===
The American Cancer Society says of chelation therapy: "Available scientific evidence does not support claims that it is effective for treating other conditions such as cancer. Chelation therapy can be toxic and has the potential to cause kidney damage, irregular heartbeat, and even death."

=== Cardiovascular disease ===
Chelation therapy for heart disease began in the 1950s after anecdotal reports that people treated with chelation for heavy metal poisoning had experienced an unexpected relief from symptoms of angina. In the 1980s-2000s, its practitioners estimated that between 100,000 and 200,000 Americans per year were undergoing chelation therapy for heart disease, at a cost of about $5,000 per course of treatment.

The American College of Cardiology and the Mayo Clinic do not currently endorse chelation therapy for heart disease.

In the 1990s and early 2000s, the weight of scientific evidence was against any benefit of chelation therapy for heart disease.

In 1998, the U.S. Federal Trade Commission (FTC) charged a chelation-advocacy group, the "American College for Advancement in Medicine" (ACAM), with making false or unsubstantiated claims when they promoted chelation therapy for heart disease on their website and on a brochure they published. In December 1998, the FTC announced that it had secured a consent agreement barring ACAM from making claims that chelation therapy is effective against atherosclerosis or any other disease of the circulatory system.

However, in 2003-2012, the National Institutes of Health (NIH) sponsored a $30 million controlled trial of chelation therapy, conducted by their National Center for Complementary and Alternative Medicine (NCCAM). This was known as the Trial to Assess Chelation Therapy or TACT. In contrast to prior controlled studies that had produced negative findings, the TACT trial found that chelation therapy modestly improves outcomes for patients with a prior heart attack or history of heart attacks, and markedly improves outcomes if the patients were also diabetic.

In the leadup to the TACT trial, NCCAM Director Stephen E. Straus cited the "widespread use of chelation therapy in lieu of established therapies, the lack of adequate prior research to verify its safety and effectiveness, and the overall impact of coronary artery disease" as factors motivating the trial. Patient enrollment was to be completed around July 2009 with final completion around July 2010, but enrollment in the trial was voluntarily suspended by organizers in September 2008 after the U.S. government's Office for Human Research Protections began investigating complaints such as inadequate informed consent. At the time of suspension, the trial was criticized for other methodological flaws, including being conducted by "fringe" clinicians, and lacking prior Phase I and II studies. The same critics claimed that previous controlled trials "found no evidence that chelation is superior to placebo for treatment of CAD [Coronary Artery Disease] or PVD [Peripheral Vascular Disease]," making the trial "unethical, dangerous, pointless, and wasteful." Evidence of insurance fraud and other felony convictions among (chelation proponent) investigators further undermined the credibility of the trial. However, the American College of Cardiology supported the trial.

The final results of the TACT trial were published in November 2012. The study enrolled 1708 patients who were in stable condition, at least 50 years old, and had had a prior heart attack. The patients were divided into two groups, receiving chelation therapy by infusions of disodium EDTA, or receiving normal recommended therapy including statins and aspirin. The study found an 18% reduction in heart events (death, another heart attack, stroke, stenting or bypass, and hospitalization for heart pains) in the patients receiving chelation therapy. And in patients with diabetes mellitus, there was a 41% reduction in clinical events, including a 43% reduction in deaths over 5 years. However, the results barely achieved statistical significance.

An editorial published in the Journal of the American Medical Association said that "the study findings may provide novel hypotheses that merit further evaluation to help understand the pathophysiology of secondary prevention of vascular disease." Critics of the study characterized it as showing no support for the use of chelation therapy in coronary heart disease, particularly the claims that chelation reduces the need for coronary bypass surgeries.

After the TACT study, further controlled studies in 2015-2022 concluded with cautious endorsements of chelation therapy for heart disease, particularly in patients with diabetes mellitus and prior heart attacks. However, an attempt to replicate the results of the TACT trial in diabetics with prior heart attacks failed to find any benefit.

=== Autism ===
According to Quackwatch, autism is one of the conditions for which chelation therapy has been falsely promoted as effective, and practitioners falsify diagnoses of metal poisoning to trick parents into having their children undergo the risky process. As of 2008, up to 7% of children with autism worldwide had been subjected to chelation therapy. The death of two children in 2005 was caused by the administration of chelation treatments, according to the American Center for Disease Control. One of them had autism. Parents either have a doctor use a treatment for lead poisoning, or buy unregulated supplements, in particular DMSA and lipoic acid. Aspies For Freedom, an autism rights organization, considers this use of chelation therapy unethical and potentially dangerous. There is little to no credible scientific research that supports the use of chelation therapy for the effective treatment of autism.

=== Deaths from chelation therapy ===
In August 2005, a five-year-old boy with autism died while undergoing chelation therapy. Others have also died while undergoing chelation therapy, including a three-year-old non-autistic girl and a non-autistic adult. These deaths were due to cardiac arrest caused by hypocalcemia during chelation therapy. In two of the cases, hypocalcemia appears to have been caused by the administration of Na2EDTA (disodium EDTA) and in the third case the type of EDTA was unknown. Only the three-year-old girl had been found to have an elevated blood lead level and resulting low iron levels and anemia, which is the conventional medical cause for administration of chelation therapy.

According to protocol, EDTA should not be used in the treatment of children. More than 30 deaths have been recorded in association with IV-administered disodium EDTA since the 1970s.

== History ==
Chelation therapy can be traced back to the early 1930s, when Ferdinand Münz, a German chemist working for I.G. Farben, first synthesized ethylenediaminetetraacetic acid (EDTA). Munz was looking for a replacement for citric acid as a water softener. Chelation therapy itself began during World War II when chemists at the University of Oxford searched for an antidote for lewisite, an arsenic-based chemical weapon. The chemists learned that EDTA was particularly effective in treating lead poisoning.

Following World War II, chelation therapy was used to treat workers who had painted United States naval vessels with lead-based paints. In the 1950s, Norman Clarke Sr. was treating workers at a battery factory for lead poisoning when he noticed that some of his patients had improved angina pectoris following chelation therapy. Clarke subsequently administered chelation therapy to patients with angina pectoris and other occlusive vascular disease and published his findings in The American Journal of the Medical Sciences in December 1956. He hypothesized that "EDTA could dissolve disease-causing plaques in the coronary systems of human beings." In a series of 283 patients treated by Clarke et al. From 1956 to 1960, 87% showed improvement in their symptomatology. Other early medical investigators made similar observations of EDTA's role in the treatment of cardiovascular disease (Bechtel, 1956; Bessman, 1957; Perry, 1961; Szekely, 1963; Wenig, 1958: and Wilder, 1962). However, later systemic reviews found that chelation was no better than placebo in treating heart disease.

In the 1960s, a chelating agent known as "British Anti-Lewisite" (BAL) was modified into DMSA, a related dithiol with far fewer side effects. DMSA quickly replaced both BAL and EDTA as the primary treatment for lead, arsenic and mercury poisoning in the United States. Esters of DMSA have been developed which are reportedly more effective; for example, the monoisoamyl ester (MiADMSA) is reportedly more effective than DMSA at clearing mercury and cadmium. Research in the former Soviet Union led to the introduction of DMPS, another dithiol, as a mercury-chelating agent. The Soviets also introduced ALA, which is transformed by the body into the dithiol dihydrolipoic acid, a mercury- and arsenic-chelating agent. DMPS has experimental status in the United States, while ALA is a common nutritional supplement.

Since the 1970s, iron chelation therapy has been used as an alternative to regular phlebotomy to treat excess iron stores in people with haemochromatosis. Other chelating agents have been discovered. They all function by making several chemical bonds with metal ions, thus rendering them much less chemically reactive. The resulting complex is water-soluble, allowing it to enter the bloodstream and be excreted harmlessly.

In 1973, a group of practicing physicians created the Academy of Medical Preventics, later renamed the American College for Advancement in Medicine (ACAM). The academy trains and certifies physicians in the safe administration of chelation therapy. Members of the academy continued to use EDTA therapy for the treatment of vascular disease and developed safer administration protocols. However, in 1998 the U.S. Federal Trade Commission (FTC) pursued the ACAM, an organization that promotes "complementary, alternative and integrative medicine" over the claims made regarding the treatment of atherosclerosis in advertisements for EDTA chelation therapy. The FTC concluded that there was a lack of scientific studies to support these claims and that the statements by the ACAM were false. In 1999, the ACAM agreed to stop presenting chelation therapy as effective in treating heart disease, avoiding legal proceedings. In 2010 the U.S. Food and Drug Administration (FDA) warned companies who sold over-the-counter (OTC) chelation products and stated that such "products are unapproved drugs and devices and that it is a violation of federal law to make unproven claims about these products. There are no FDA-approved OTC chelation products."

== See also ==
- List of ineffective cancer treatments
- Detoxification
- Chelation of heavy metals in autism
