= 2,3-Dimercapto-1-propanesulfonic acid =

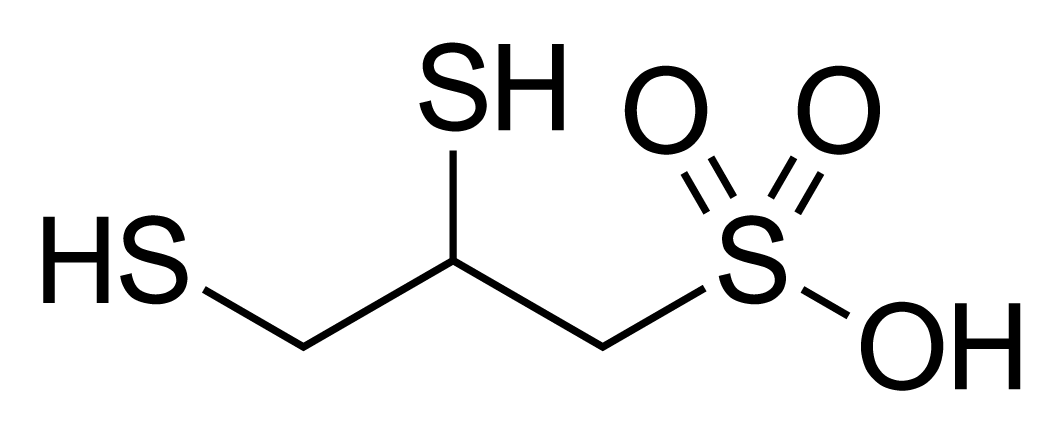

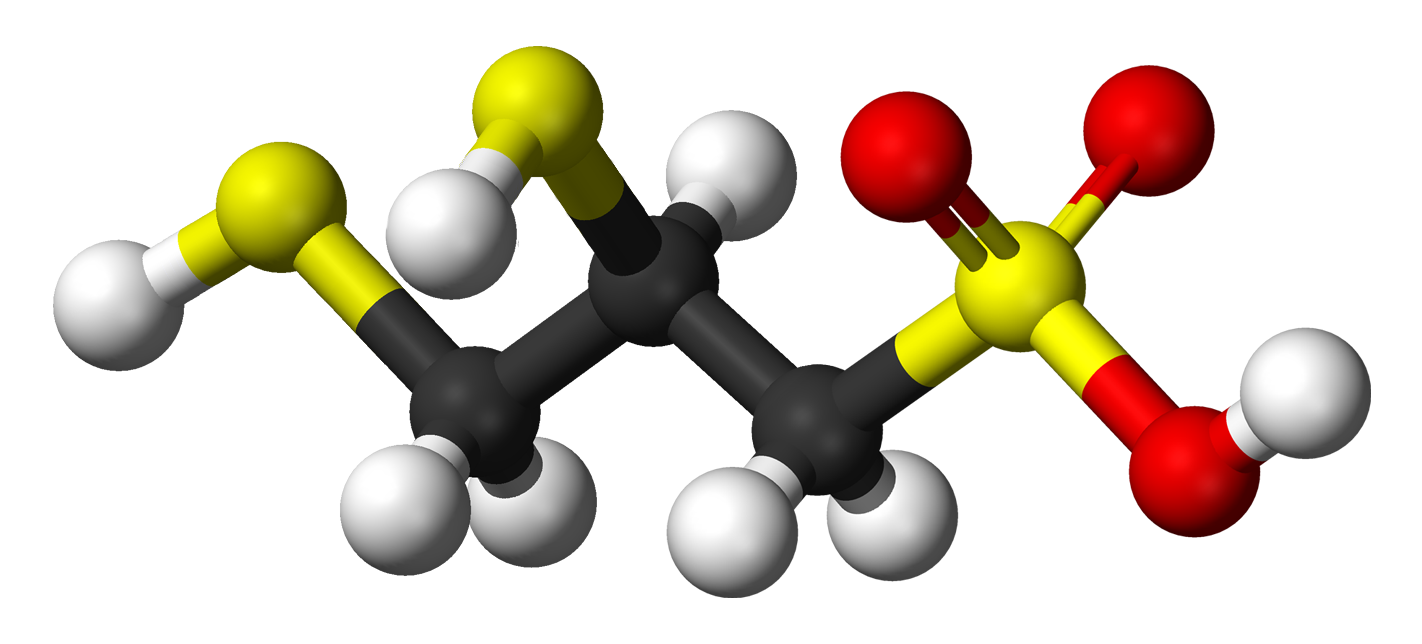

Names
- Preferred IUPAC name 2,3-Bis(sulfanyl)propane-1-sulfonic acid
- Other names 2,3-Dimercaptopropane-1-sulfonic acid

Identifiers
CAS Number	74-61-3
3D model (JSmol)	Interactive image; Interactive image
ChEBI	CHEBI:888
ChemSpider	6081
KEGG	C10922
MeSH	Unithiol
PubChem CID	6321
UNII	086L82361J
CompTox Dashboard (EPA)	DTXSID5048344
- InChI: InChI=1S/C3H8O3S3/c4-9(5,6)2-3(8)1-7/h3,7-8H,1-2H2,(H,4,5,6) Key: JLVSRWOIZZXQAD-UHFFFAOYSA-N; InChI=1/C3H8O3S3/c4-9(5,6)2-3(8)1-7/h3,7-8H,1-2H2,(H,4,5,6) Key: JLVSRWOIZZXQAD-UHFFFAOYAD
- SMILES: OS(=O)(=O)CC(S)CS; O=S(=O)(O)CC(S)CS

Properties
Chemical formula	C_{3}H_{8}O_{3}S_{3}
Molar mass	188.27 g·mol^{−1}
- Except where otherwise noted, data are given for materials in their standard state (at 25 °C [77 °F], 100 kPa). verify (what is ?) Infobox references

2,3-Dimercapto-1-propanesulfonic acid (abbreviated DMPS) and its sodium salt (known as Unithiol) are chelating agents that form complexes with various heavy metals. They are related to dimercaprol, which is another chelating agent.

The synthesis of DMPS was first reported in 1956 by V. E. Petrunkin. The effects of DMPS on heavy metal poisoning, including with polonium-210, were investigated in the following years. DMPS was found to have some protective effect, prolonging the survival time.

== Antidote ==
=== Mercury ===
A study was undertaken of DMPS use by workers involved in the production of a calomel skin bleaching lotion and in direct contact with mercurous chloride and that already showed elevated urine mercury levels. The sodium salt of DMPS was found to be effective in lowering the body burden of mercury and in decreasing the urinary mercury concentration to normal levels.

DMPS administered to a mercury poisoned animal model failed to remove the mercury from tissues and reduce the inorganic mercury burden in the brain, indicating it is not a useful intra-cellular chelation agent.

=== Other poisons ===
Sodium DMPS with Vitamin B6 is highly effective for tetramethylenedisulfotetramine poisoning in mice. Na-DMPS was identified as a potential antidote due to misdiagnosis of a poisoned patient in 1998, leading to them being treated with Na-DMPS and unexpected improvement.

A 2020 study found DMPS to provide some benefits taken orally in mitigating effects from hemotoxic snakebites (using venom from saw-scaled vipers Echis) in mouse models when given soon after exposure, suggesting its potential for repurposing as a prehospital treatment.

== Side effects ==
A 2008 study reported a case of Stevens–Johnson syndrome (SJS), a potentially serious disease, in a child undergoing chelation therapy with DMPS; the SJS resolved gradually after the chelation therapy was stopped.

== See also ==
- Chelation therapy
- Dimercaptosuccinic acid
- EDTA
- Heavy metal poisoning
- Mercury poisoning
