= Mercury regulation in the United States =

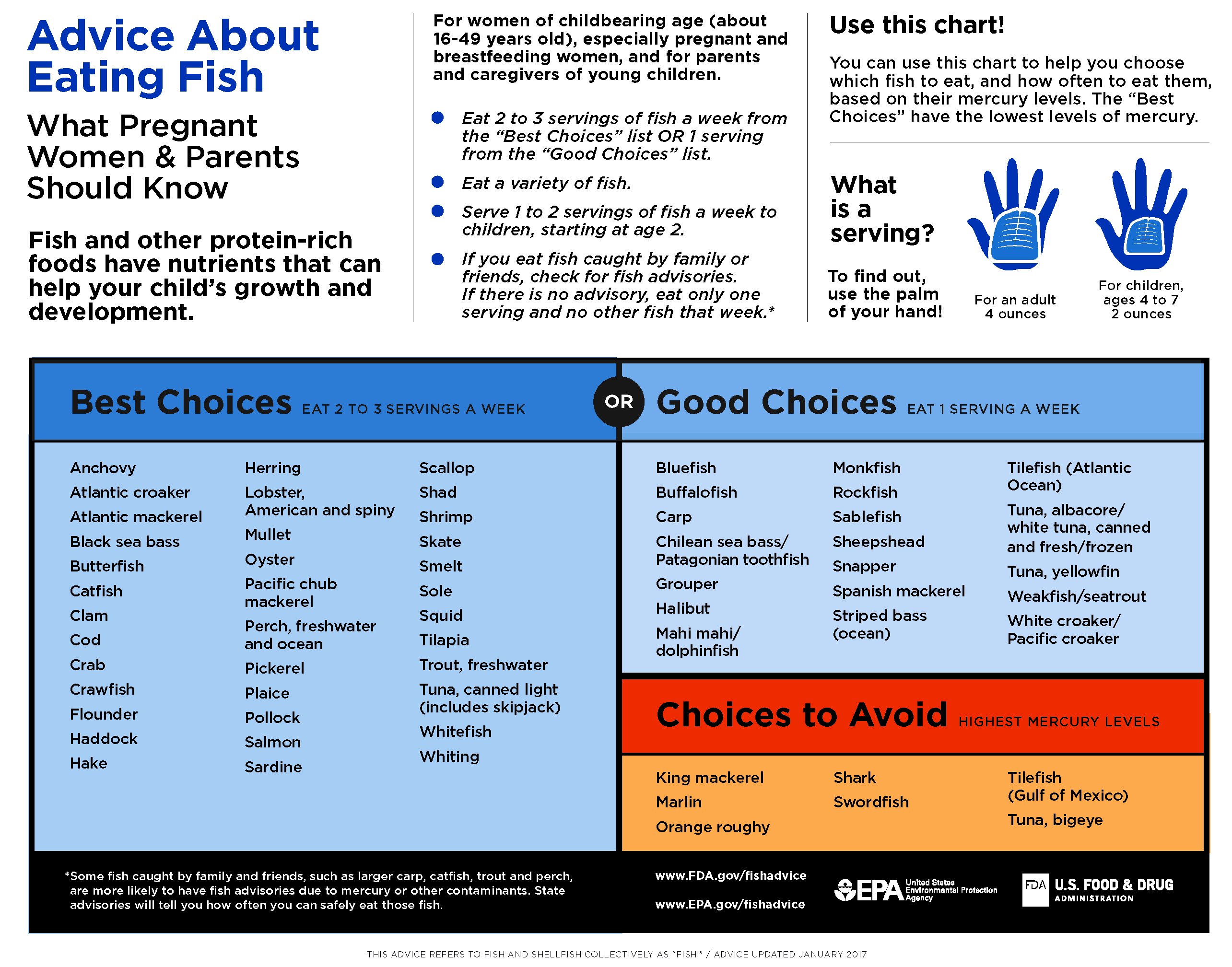
Fish advisory chart issued by U.S. Environmental Protection Agency and Food and Drug Administration. The types of fish to eat are categorized based on the mercury levels found in fish and the risk to human health.

Mercury regulation in the United States limit the maximum concentrations of mercury (Hg) that is permitted in air, water, soil, food and drugs. The regulations are promulgated by agencies such as the Environmental Protection Agency (EPA) and Food and Drug Administration (FDA), as well as a variety of state and local authorities. EPA published the Mercury and Air Toxics Standards (MATS) regulation in 2012; the first federal standards requiring power plants to limit emissions of mercury and other toxic gases.

== Background ==
=== Forms of mercury ===
Mercury occurs naturally in the environment and exists in many forms. In pure form, it is known as "elemental" or "metallic" mercury. Elemental mercury is a shiny, silver-white metal that is liquid at room temperature. If not sealed off, mercury slowly evaporates into the air, forming a vapor. The quantity of vapor formed increases as temperatures rise. Elemental mercury is traditionally used in thermometers and some electrical switches.

Inorganic mercury compounds or mercury salts, more commonly found in nature, include mercuric sulphide (HgS), mercuric oxide (HgO) and mercuric chloride (HgCl_{2}). Most of these are white powders or crystals, except for mercuric sulphide which is red and turns black after exposure to light.

Organic mercury is formed when mercury combines with carbon and other elements. Examples of organic mercury compounds are dimethylmercury, phenylmercuric acetate, and methylmercuric chloride. The form most commonly found in the environment is methylmercury.

=== How mercury exists in the environment ===
Elemental mercury in the atmosphere can undergo transformation into inorganic mercury forms, providing a significant pathway for deposition of emitted elemental mercury.

Some micro-organisms can produce organic mercury, particularly methylmercury, from other mercury forms. Methylmercury can accumulate in living organisms and reach high levels in fish and marine mammals via a process called biomagnification (i.e. concentrations increase in the food chain).

Being an element, mercury cannot be broken down or degraded into harmless substances. Mercury may change between different states and species in its cycle, but its simplest form is elemental mercury, which itself is harmful to humans and the environment. Once mercury has been liberated from either ores or from fossil fuel and mineral deposits hidden in the Earth's crust and released into the biosphere, it can be highly mobile, cycling between the Earth's surface and the atmosphere. The Earth's surface soils, water bodies and bottom sediments are thought to be the primary biospheric sinks for mercury.

=== Mercury speciation ===
The different forms mercury exists in (such as elemental mercury vapour, methylmercury, or mercuric chloride) are commonly designated "species". As mentioned above, the main groups of mercury species are elemental mercury, inorganic and organic mercury forms. Speciation is the term commonly used to represent the distribution of a quantity of mercury among various species.

Speciation influences the transport of mercury within and between environmental compartments including the atmosphere and oceans, among others. For example, the speciation is a determining factor for how far from the source mercury emitted to air is transported. Mercury adsorbed on particles and ionic (e.g., divalent) mercury compounds will fall on land and water mainly in the vicinity of the sources (local to regional distances), while elemental mercury vapour is transported on a hemispherical/global scale making mercury emissions a global concern. Another example is the so-called "polar sunrise mercury depletion incidence", where the transformation of elemental mercury to divalent mercury is influenced by increased solar activity and the presence of ice crystals, resulting in a substantial increase in mercury deposition during a three-month period (approximately March to June).

Moreover, speciation determines how to control mercury emissions to air. For example, emissions of inorganic mercuric compounds (such as mercuric chloride) are captured reasonably well by some control devices (such as wet-scrubbers), while capture of elemental mercury tends to be low for most emission control devices.

=== Sources of mercury ===
The releases of mercury to the biosphere can be grouped in four categories:

- Natural sources - releases due to natural mobilization of naturally occurring mercury from the Earth's crust, such as volcanic activity and weathering of rocks
- Current anthropogenic (associated with human activity) releases from the mobilization of mercury impurities in raw materials such as fossil fuels – particularly coal, and to a lesser extent gas and oil and other extracted, treated and recycled minerals
- Current anthropogenic releases resulting from mercury used intentionally in products and processes, due to releases during manufacturing, leaks, disposal or incineration of spent products or other releases
- Re-mobilization of historic anthropogenic mercury releases previously deposited in soils, sediments, water bodies, landfills and waste/tailings piles.

The majority of atmospheric anthropogenic emissions are released as gaseous elemental mercury. The atmospheric residence time of elemental mercury is in the range of months to roughly one year. This makes transport on a hemispherical scale possible and emissions in any continent can thus contribute to the deposition in other continents. Estimates developed in the early 2000s are that less than half of all mercury deposition within the U.S. comes from U.S. sources.

==== Anthropogenic sources ====
The largest emissions of mercury to the global atmosphere occur from combustion of fossil fuels; mainly coal in utility, industrial, and residential boilers. As much as two thirds of the total emission of ca. 2269 tonnes of mercury emitted from all anthropogenic sources worldwide in 2000 came from combustion of fossil fuels. Other anthropogenic sources of mercury include: cement production (mercury in lime), mining (iron/steel, zinc, gold), use of fluorescent lamps, various instruments and dental amalgam fillings, manufacturing of products containing mercury (thermometers, manometers and other instruments, electrical and electronic switches) and waste disposal.

=== Exposure to mercury ===
Mercury in the air eventually settles into water or onto land where it can be washed into water. Once deposited, certain microorganisms can change it into methylmercury, a highly toxic form that builds up in fish, shellfish and animals that eat fish. The general population is primarily exposed to methylmercury through the diet (especially fish) and to elemental mercury vapors due to dental amalgams. Depending on local mercury pollution load, substantial additional contributions to the intake of total mercury can occur through air and water.

=== Health effects ===
Exposure to mercury differs depending on the type of food as well as dietetic practices. In fact, the biggest contribution of mercury comes from different fish sources and seafood. This contribution is estimated to be around 20 to 85% of the mercury intake of the general population. Other sources are significant such as water consumption, some of the cereals choices, some specific vegetables as well as a variety of red and white meat. Dietetic practices are able to alter mercury toxicity such as chewing boiled eggs or even chewing gum. In fact, those two practices have been proved to be able to reduce mercury exposure by increasing the mercury release. Such practices, in addition to food intakes, might explain the differences observed between the populations regarding the mercury toxicity. Nutrients intake is another factor explaining the changes in the toxicity levels of mercury as well as their effects. Selenium for example works as a protective agent against mercury toxicity obtained through fish intake. Other nutrients such as thiamine deficiency at the general population demonstrates an aggravation of the mercury exposure symptoms. Similar to thiamine, iron aggravates mercury exposure effect while ascorbic acid will help reduce the mercury toxicity effect. Fat is another agent that participates in the reduction of the mercury toxicity. In fact, higher LDL levels has been proved to help reducing mercury effects.

In fact, those nutrients are able not only to affect the mercury bioavailability but they affect as well their immunological influences as well as their biochemical, cytological and metabolic responses to mercury. On the other hand, multiple nutrients are found to interact with several other nutrients and elements in such a manner that would affect the mercury exposure toxicity as well as their metabolism.

Moreover, a variety of fish, milk, meat and wheat accompagned of selenium, zinc, magnesium, and vitamins C, E and B allow an alteration of the mercury metabolism.

Those multifactorial correlations are extremely hard to establish. In fact, concluding that it is a protective or aggravating correlation is always complicated and dependent on metabolic conditions.

Mercury exposure might have a variety of health effects depending on the population. In fact, some populations are affected by a lack of appetite others have seen a reduction of their food or fluid intake as well as a significant weight loss. Those alterations as well as the chronic intake of mercury might worsen a certain nutrition deficiency. Some of the most common deficiency observed with chronic mercury intake is a selenium deficiency. Such deficiency might impact neuronal functions as well as behaviour disorders and learning disabilities for children. Other deficiencies that are observed with a persisting mercury intake are vitamin E, vitamin B12 and vitamin C. Long term deficiency in vitamin E might cause muscle weakness as well as loss of muscle mass, abnormal eye movements and even vision problems. As for vitamin B12 deficiency, it might cause anemia and confusion for the elderly population. Finally, for long term vitamin C deficiencies, high blood pressure as well as gallbladder disease and stroke are all possible outcomes of those deficiencies. In order to avoid such deficiencies, a higher intake of those nutrients and vitamins are necessary.

Methylmercury is a type of mercury that is liquid at room temperature. The methylmercury is used for the preservation of grains that are used for animal food. The methylmercury is obtained through the methylation of the mercury with the presence of anaerobic bacteria in the waters as well as sediments and soils. In fact, most microbes that live in lakes, rivers, oceans are able to create the methylmercury.

Methylmercury has different ways of transferring itself. In fact, methylmercury is transferred through maternal milk during breast feeding. This methylmercury in breast feeding milk is transferred through fatty cells that allows the methylmercury to be transported through the milk. Methylmercury can pass through the placental barrier, allowing the compound to accumulate within the fetus.

Almost all people have at least trace amounts of methylmercury in their tissues, reflecting methylmercury's widespread presence in the environment and people's exposure through the consumption of fish and shellfish. Although the presence of Mercury is quite common, most people remain below the levels that can lead to contamination or poisoning.

For fetuses, infants, and children, the primary health effect of methylmercury is impaired neurological development. Methylmercury exposure in the womb, which can result from a mother's consumption of fish and shellfish that contain methylmercury, can adversely affect a baby's growing brain and nervous system (see: Minamata disease). Impacts on cognitive thinking, memory, attention, language, and fine motor and visual spatial skills have been seen in children exposed to methylmercury in the womb.

Elemental (metallic) mercury primarily causes health effects when it is breathed as a vapor where it can be absorbed through the lungs. These exposures can occur when elemental mercury is spilled or products that contain elemental mercury break and expose mercury to the air, particularly in warm or poorly ventilated indoor spaces. emotional changes (e.g., mood swings, irritability, nervousness, excessive shyness); insomnia; neuromuscular changes (such as weakness, muscle atrophy, twitching); headaches; disturbances in sensations; changes in nerve responses; performance deficits on tests of cognitive function. At higher exposures there may be kidney effects, respiratory failure and death.

For methylmercury, the US Environmental Protection Agency (US EPA) has estimated a safe daily intake level of 0.1 μg/kg body weight per day.

The National Institute for Occupational Safety and Health (NIOSH) recommends that exposures to mercury metal be limited to an average of 0.05 mg/m^{3} over a 10-hour workday in addition to a ceiling limit of 0.1 mg/m^{3}. The American Conference of Governmental Industrial Hygienists (ACGIH) recommends that metallic mercury exposures be limited to an average of 0.025 mg/m^{3} over an 8-hour workday.

=== Environmental effects ===
A very important factor in the impacts of mercury to the environment is its ability to build up in organisms and up along the food chain. All forms of mercury can accumulate in organisms. However, methylmercury is taken up at a faster rate than other forms and bioaccumulates to a greater extent. The biomagnification of methylmercury has a most significant influence on the impact on animals and humans. Fish appear to bind methylmercury strongly, nearly 100 percent of mercury that bioaccumulates in predator fish is methylmercury. Consequently, the elimination of methylmercury from fish is very slow. Given steady environmental concentrations, mercury concentrations in individuals of a given fish species tend to increase with age as a result of the slow elimination of methylmercury and increased intake due to changes in trophic position that often occur as fish grow to larger sizes.

While much is generally known about mercury bioaccumulation and biomagnification, the process is extremely complex and involves complicated biogeochemical cycling and ecological interactions. As a result, although accumulation/magnification can be observed, the extent of mercury biomagnification in fish is not easily predicted across different sites.

Several exposure pathways are possible for both plants and animals in terrestrial systems. The two main pathways by which terrestrial plants can be exposed to mercury are uptake from soils into the roots and absorption directly from the air. Potential exposure routes for terrestrial animals include the following: (1) ingestion of mercury-contaminated food; (2) direct contact with contaminated soil; (3) ingestion of mercury-contaminated drinking water; and (4) inhalation.

== U.S. regulations to prevent mercury contamination ==
=== Reasons for regulation ===
Inorganic mercury released into the atmosphere is converted to methylmercury by the action of microbes that live in aquatic systems including lakes, rivers, wetlands, sediments, soils and the open ocean. The methylmercury is absorbed by plankton and small fish. As these organisms are consumed by larger species up the food chain, the mercury concentration is magnified. Currently, humans around the world collectively emit 2000 metric tons per year. With strict regulations, the number could be decreased to 800 metric tons, however, if humans continue without stricter regulations, the number will increase to 3400 metric tons. One factor that increases the effects of mercury contamination is the presence of coniferous forests. Additionally, the fact that mercury can travel far distances from its location of release provides further justification for regulation. For instance, mercury contamination occurs in the Arctic and Antarctic, where it has not been released.

Because mercury can travel from its release location to areas all over the world, and because fish is traded worldwide, mercury regulation that only focuses on the state or national level is not sufficient. Examples of this ineffectiveness include states in the U.S. that regulate water quality with respect to mercury. Even if that state has strict mercury regulations, water quality can be negatively affected by mercury emissions from a neighboring state or country, demonstrating further need for global regulations. Lastly, scientists stress the importance of developing long-term solutions to mercury contamination because, currently, the advice to avoid consuming high amounts of fish prevents people from getting vital nutrients, and is impractical in places where fish is the main source of food.

=== Regulations governing use of mercury ===
Regulations associated with mercury use in commerce impose costs, conditions, and/or restrictions associated with obtaining, selling, using, or transporting mercury. The following categories describe mercury use regulations: (1) commerce-related regulations such as taxes and transportation requirements; (2) product-related restrictions; and (3) reporting requirements.

Mercury use regulations affect only those facilities that use mercury as an input. They do not affect those sources that release mercury incidentally as a by-product.

==== Commerce-related regulations ====
Commerce Type	Regulation	Law or Example	Mercury Information	Regulatory Mechanism
Obtaining Mercury	Excise Tax	Internal Revenue Code of 1986 (26 USCA §4661)	The Internal Revenue Code imposes taxes on 40 chemicals, including mercury, that are sold by the manufacturer, producer, or importer . The tax rate for mercury is $4.45/ton, the second highest tax rate listed (10 substances have the highest tax rate of $4.87/ton).	Input/sales tax
	Import Tax	Harmonized Tariff Schedule of the United States	Mercury and several mercury compounds are subject to import taxes under the Harmonized Tariff Schedule of the United States, which identifies import taxes on all goods imported into the United States from most-favored-nation (MFN) countries, as well as from special treaty nations and non-most-favored-nation (non-MFN) countries. For 1994, the tax rate for mercury imports from MFN countries is 16.5 ¢/kg, compared to a 55.1 ¢/kg tax on imports from non-MFN countries (item 2805.40). Due to special treaty agreements, no duty is imposed on mercury imports from Canada, Israel, Bolivia, Colombia, Ecuador, and Caribbean Basin countries.	Tax
	Government Mercury Stockpile Sales	Strategic and Critical Materials Stockpile Act (50 USCA §98)	The Strategic and Critical Materials Stockpile Act regulates mercury that the Defense Logistics Agency (DLA) sells from the National Defense Stockpile. The amount of mercury sold from the stockpile has the potential to affect the mercury market, although DLA considers its impact on the market when requesting Congressional authorization for sales. DLA accepts daily bids for mercury. Over the last year, the price of DLA mercury has ranged from $57 – 82 per flask.	Command & Control
Transporting Mercury	Transportation	The Hazardous Materials Transportation Act	The Department of Transportation regulates hazardous materials transport under the Hazardous Materials Transportation Act (HMTA). Mercury and mercury compounds are hazardous substances subject to packaging, shipping and transportation rules for hazardous materials. RCRA regulations for hazardous waste transporters incorporate HMTA rules	Operating requirements, Labeling
Using Mercury	Use restrictions		Currently, only Minnesota has a use-restriction law providing that mercury sold in the state will be used only for medical, dental, instructional, research, or manufacturing purposes. Sellers must provide buyers with a material safety data sheet and have the buyer sign a statement of proper use and disposal.	

==== Product-related restrictions ====
Federal Insecticide, Fungicide and Rodenticide Act (FIFRA)

FIFRA covers the sale and use of pesticides, including registration of chemicals that meet health and safety tests. Until recently, several mercury compounds were registered as pesticides, bactericides, and fungicides. By 1991, however, all registrations for mercury compounds in paints had been canceled by EPA or voluntarily withdrawn by the manufacturer. Registrations for calo-chlor and calo-gran, the last mercury-based pesticides registered for use in the United States (to control pink and grey snow mold) were voluntarily canceled by the manufacturer in November 1993. Existing stocks may be sold until depleted.

Federal Food, Drug, and Cosmetic Act (FFDCA)

The Food and Drug Administration is responsible for mercury in food, drugs, and cosmetics. Mercury use as a preservative or antimicrobial is limited to eye-area cosmetics or ointments in concentrations below 60ppm. Yellow mercuric oxide is not recognized as a safe and effective ophthalmic anti-infective ingredient. The FDA also regulates dental amalgam under FFDCA. Dental mercury is classified as a Class I medical device, with extensive safety regulations on its use. Dental amalgam alloy is classified as a Class II device, subject to additional special controls.

Mercury-Containing and Rechargeable Battery Management Act of 1996

The Mercury-Containing and Rechargeable Battery Management Act of 1996 (Battery Act) phases out the use of mercury in batteries, and provides for the efficient and cost-effective disposal of used nickel cadmium (Ni-Cd) batteries, used small sealed lead-acid (SSLA) batteries, and certain other regulated batteries. The statute applies to battery and product manufacturers, battery waste handlers, and certain battery and product importers and retailers.

==== Reporting requirements ====
At a federal level, only facilities that exceed threshold planning quantities for mercury under SARA Title III regulations must report that quantity to their local emergency planning commission. EPA is currently considering a chemical use inventory, which would track the quantities of chemicals used at individual facilities.

Currently, only Michigan has regulations that specifically require facilities to report the quantities of chemicals used. Under the Part 9 rules of Act 245, Michigan's water pollution control act, businesses that use any substance listed on the "Critical Materials Registry" must report the quantities of each substance used and released. Mercury is included the Critical Materials Registry. The state uses this information to assist in permit development and compliance in its water program.

=== Regulations governing releases of mercury ===
Regulations associated with releases or mercury into the environment impose costs, conditions, and/or restrictions on activities that incidentally discharge mercury into the environment. The following categories describe mercury release regulations: (1) airborne releases; (2) effluent discharges into waters; (3) hazardous waste disposal; and (4) reporting requirements.

==== Airborne releases ====
The primary piece of federal legislation governing the airborne release of mercury in the United States is the Clean Air Act. Unlike the criteria air pollutants, mercury is classified under the Act as a hazardous air pollutant and is thus subject to control under the National Emissions Standards for Hazardous Air Pollutants (NESHAP's) rather than the National Ambient Air Quality Standards (NAAQS). The key distinction is that the former is controlled by establishing performance standards under a program known as maximum achievable control technology standards (MACT), designed to reduce hazardous air pollutant emissions to a maximum achievable degree, by setting a standard at least as stringent as the emission reductions achieved by the average of the top 12% best controlled in the same pollution sources. However, as of early 2011, no federal limits of mercury from coal and oil-fired electric utility steam generating units (EGUs) were on the books. The development of a regulatory policy framework to guide the emissions of mercury from power plants is on-going, the major developments of which have occurred largely within the last decade.

The movement toward the regulation of mercury from EGUs began in December 2000, when the Environmental Protection Agency determined the regulation of coal and oil-fired EGUs to be "appropriate and necessary" under the Clean Air Act, Section 112(c) standards for mercury emissions, adding these units to the list of sources that must be regulated. This push gained further impetus in 2005, when the EPA released a report titled The Nata Inventory Modified for the Toxics Rule 2005 Base Year, which linked 2/3's of the total amount of mercury released in 1990 to three source categories: stationary power plants, municipal waste combustors, and medical waste incinerators.

Additionally, according to the report the two latter categories saw 96% and 98% reductions of total mercury release, respectively, between the 15-year period between 1990 and 2005 while power plant emissions fell by only 10%. By 2005, coal-fired power plants made up the largest single source of airborne mercury emissions.

Given these findings, the EPA reversed its earlier decision by offering a final revision of the 'appropriate and necessary finding' for coal and oil-fired EGUs by ultimately deciding to exclude these units from the 112 list. In its place, the EPA issued a rule to permanently cap and reduce mercury emissions from stationary power facilities. The Clean Air Mercury Rule (CAMR) was designed to reduce emissions of mercury from stationary power plants through a cap-and-trade system of regulations, with the goal of a 70% reduction, from 48 to 15 tons annually. The proposed cap was set to be phased in two distinct phases, the first set at 38 tons annually while the second phase, set to commence 2018, required a cap of 15 tons annually.

In December 2008, the D.C. Court of Appeals vacated the CAMR on the grounds that it illegally exempts utilities from the list of regulated source categories under the MACT standards. On March 16, 2011 EPA proposes Mercury and Air Toxic Standards, the first nationwide limits on coal-fired power plant emissions of mercury. Specifically, the proposal aims to reduce emissions from new and existing coal and oil-fired EGUs by 91% from current levels through national quantity-based, numerical emission limits on mercury releases. As part of this new rule, the EPA is also offering a proposal to "monitor" changes to industrial and commercial steam generating units New Source Performance Standard, but does not propose to change those emission standards. According to the EPA, the Power Plant Mercury and Air Toxics Standards are expected to have broad health benefits (due to reductions in several pollutants, not just mercury), including the prevention in the year 2016 of between 6,800 and 17,000 premature deaths and 11,000 non-fatal heart attacks. The EPA has also announced public hearings throughout the month of May.

Under the Title V Operating Permits program, states may impose emissions fees up to $25/ton of emissions for all chemicals. Facilities releasing mercury are subject to this fee for their mercury emissions. Without a differential fee structure, the fee alone is not likely to be high enough to spur reductions in mercury emissions. For instance, Wisconsin's largest source of mercury air emissions, an electric utility, would only pay $15.90 for its mercury releases (.63 ton @$25/ton).

Many states have operated independently from the federal EPA in setting their own emission reduction targets. In 2007, 18 states proposed more stringent abatement levels than what was proposed at the federal level at the time.

==== Water pollution ====
The Clean Water Act governs pollution of surface waters. In the first several decades since enactment of the 1972 law, EPA and states' approach to mercury pollution focused on discharges to surface waters from point sources (principally factories, power plants, and sewage treatment plants). A variety of mercury discharge standards have been published in national regulations. Implementation of these standards, along with changes in manufacturing industries to reduce or eliminate use of mercury, has resulted in a reduction of mercury discharges to surface waters since the 1970s. However, in the 21st century, mercury is still entering many water bodies through atmospheric deposition, mainly from combustion of coal.

Point source regulatory program

Point source discharges require permits under the National Pollutant Discharge Elimination System (NPDES). Facilities discharging to a river, lake or coastal water body are called "direct dischargers." Most permits are issued by state environmental agencies; EPA issues permits in certain jurisdictions.

Technology-based standards

NPDES permits include technology-based effluent limitations, which are based on the performance of control and treatment technologies. Facilities that discharge to sewage treatment plants (also called publicly owned treatment works or POTWs) are classified as "indirect dischargers" and are subject to local sewage authority requirements. Industrial indirect dischargers, and some commercial facilities (including dental offices) are also subject to EPA regulations.

EPA has included limitations for mercury discharges in nine of the technology-based industrial/commercial regulations ("effluent guidelines"):

- Battery manufacturing
- Centralized waste treatment
- Dental offices
- Electric power plants. In 2015 EPA added mercury effluent limitations to its electric power plant regulation.
- Inorganic chemicals manufacturing
- Nonferrous metals manufacturing
- Ore mining
- Pesticide manufacturing (including a zero discharge of pollutants requirement for some facilities)
- Waste combustors (commercial incinerators)

For other industries, limitations for mercury discharges may be included in permits if appropriate, according to the "best professional judgement" (BPJ) of the permit-issuing agency.

Indirect discharges of mercury to sewage treatment plants

Mercury (and other metals) that are discharged to POTWs are frequently typically removed within the treatment system and end up in the sewage plant's sludge. POTWs may have mercury discharge limits in their permits, and may have difficulty disposing metal-contaminated sludges; therefore some POTW authorities limit or prohibit their industrial and commercial users from discharging mercury into the sewer system. Some authorities also promote voluntary mercury reduction/elimination practices with their customers.

Through the early 21st century, most POTWs did not regulate the dental amalgam waste (which contains mercury) disposed down the drains at dental offices. In 2005 the American Dental Association (ADA) estimated that 50% of the mercury entering POTWs was discharged by dental offices, as they disposed of dental amalgam waste. The ADA study and other research supported EPA's 2014 estimate that dental offices—over 100,000 nationwide—were annually sending 4.4 tons of mercury to POTWs. This finding contributed to the agency's decision to develop national effluent limitations for dental offices, which became effective in 2017.

Sewage sludge disposal standards

EPA's national standards for POTW sludge disposal set the following limits for mercury:

- 57 mg/kg (maximum concentration)
- 17 kg/ha (cumulative pollutant loading rate)
- 0.85 kg/ha per 365-day period (annual pollutant loading rate).

Sludges applied below these levels may be disposed of on farms or other open land, or in landfills.

Water quality standards

The Clean Water Act requires states to identify water bodies that are not meeting water quality standards, and to develop plans to address these impairments, in the form of total maximum daily loads (TMDLs). Several states have issued TMDLs specifically for mercury pollution:

1. Seven northeastern states (Connecticut, Maine, Massachusetts, New York, New Hampshire, Vermont, Rhode Island) published a regional TMDL for mercury in 2007. The TMDL covers more than 10,000 lakes, ponds, and reservoirs, and over 46,000 river miles (74,000 km). The focus of the plan is on reducing atmospheric deposition of mercury, which is the principal pollution source, rather than developing additional controls on point source or nonpoint source discharges.
2. Minnesota published its statewide TMDL for mercury in 2007. Ninety-nine percent of the mercury in Minnesota waters is from air deposition; two-thirds of the state's water bodies have been contaminated by mercury.

Fish consumption advisories

EPA and state agencies publish fish consumption advisories which identify fishing locations (water bodies) and types of fish that should be avoided due to mercury contamination.

==== Hazardous Waste ====
Resource Conservation and Recovery Act (RCRA) regulations outline specific classification and disposal requirements for products and wastes that contain mercury. In general, RCRA regulations are waste-specific, not source-specific, and thus may apply to any facility that generates mercury-containing wastes. RCRA regulations assign specific waste codes to five types of wastes that are either "characteristic" wastes or "listed" wastes. Mercury is both a characteristic and a listed waste under RCRA. RCRA regulations describe specific disposal requirements for individual waste codes. All mercury-bearing wastes (wastewaters and nonwastewaters) are subject to land disposal restrictions. RCRA regulations also influence product disposal and recycling options for mercury containing products. On February 23, 2011, following ten years of litigation, the EPA released scaled-back air emission rules for industrial boilers and solid waste incinerators. The recently released final rules address hazardous air pollutant ("HAP") emission standards for industrial, commercial and institutional boilers and process heaters (the Boiler Maximum Achievable Control Technology or "Boiler MACT" rule) and commercial and industrial solid waste incineration units (the "CISWI" rule). Industrial boilers and process heaters burn fuels such as natural gas, biomass, coal and oil to produce heat or electricity; CISWIs burn solid waste. The Boiler MACT rules create emission limits for mercury, particulate matter and carbon monoxide for all new coal-fired boilers with heat input greater than 10 million Btu per hour and particulate matter emission limits for new biomass and oil-fired boilers.

==== Reporting requirements ====
Emergency Planning and Community Right-to-Know Act establishes emergency release, inventory, and release reporting requirements. The requirement includes the Toxics Release Inventory (TRI), which requires facilities in the manufacturing sector (SIC codes 20-39) to report releases to air, water, and land for all listed chemicals, including mercury. Other sections require facilities to report spills of listed substances above a threshold reporting quantity (reportable quantities), and the quantities of chemicals stored above a specified threshold planning quantity.

== U.S. environmental standards ==
Media	Mercury Standard	Explanation
Ambient Water Recommendations for Aquatic Life	1.4 μg/L for freshwater maximum acute concentrations (CMC); 0.77 μg/L for freshwater continuous concentrations (CCC); 1.8 μg/L for saltwater maximum acute concentrations (CMC); 0.94 μg/L for saltwater continuous concentrations (CCC)	These recommendations are for methylmercury (MeHg) concentrations; CMC ≡ Criterion Maximum Concentration (acute); CCC ≡ Criterion Continuous Concentration (chronic)
Drinking Water	Maximum contaminant level = 0.002 mg/L (40 CFR 141.62)	Maximum contaminant level for mercury established under the Safe Drinking Water Act
Groundwater	2 μg/L	
Bottled Water	0.002 mg/L (21 CFR 103.35)	
Water-level of detect	0.2 μg/L (200 ng/L) = recommended method	EPA-approved method to detect Hg in water. Lower detection methods are available, but not yet approved by EPA
Air	No ambient standard	
Sewage Sludge	17 mg/kg (dry wt) and 17 kg/hectare cumulative loading for sludge applied on agricultural, forest and publicly accessible lands (40 CFR 503, Table 2 of §503.13); 17 mg/kg (dry wt) and .85 kg/hectare annual loading rate for sludge sold or distributed for application to a lawn or home garden (40 CFR 503, Table 3 of §503.13); 57 mg/kg (dry wt) for sludge sold or distributed for other types of land disposal (40 CFR 503, Table 1 of §503.13)	
Compost	No federal standards	Minnesota sets mercury concentration limits incompost
Fish	1 mg/kg; 0.3 mg/kg	FDA action level for methylmercury; EPA maximum recommended fish tissue methylmercury residue based on a total fish consumption rate of 0.0175 kg/day
Hazardous Waste	TCLP leachate ≥ 0.2 mg/L (40 CFR 261.24, 264)	Land disposal (Subtitle D, nonhazardous landfills) prohibited unless leachate contains less than 0.2 mg/L

== Global regulations ==
=== Global convention ===
==== Convention on Long-range Transboundary Air Pollution and The 1998 Aarhus Protocol on Heavy Metals ====
Since 1979 the Convention on Long-range Transboundary Air Pollution has addressed some of the major environmental problems of the UNECE region through scientific collaboration and policy negotiation. The Convention has been extended by eight protocols that identify specific measures to be taken by Parties to cut their emissions of air pollutants. The Executive Body adopted the Protocol on Heavy Metals on 24 June 1998 in Aarhus (Denmark). It targets three particularly harmful metals: cadmium, lead and mercury. According to one of the basic obligations, Parties will have to reduce their emissions for these three metals below their levels in 1990 (or an alternative year between 1985 and 1995). The Protocol aims to cut emissions from industrial sources (iron and steel industry, non-ferrous metal industry), combustion processes (power generation, road transport) and waste incineration. It lays down stringent limit values for emissions from stationary sources and suggests best available techniques (BAT) for these sources, such as special filters or scrubbers for combustion sources or mercury-free processes. The Protocol requires Parties to phase out leaded petrol. It also introduces measures to lower heavy metal emissions from other products, such as mercury in batteries, and proposes the introduction of management measures for other mercury-containing products, such as electrical components (thermostats, switches), measuring devices (thermometers, manometers, barometers), fluorescent lamps, dental amalgam, pesticides and paint.

==== The Basel Convention ====
The Basel Convention on the Control of Transboundary Movements of Hazardous Wastes and their Disposal was brought into force in 1992 in order to prevent the transportation of hazardous wastes to developing countries. Over 170 countries have now joined the convention, including Australia who became a member of the Basel Convention on 5 February 1992.

==== The Rotterdam PIC Convention ====
The Rotterdam PIC Convention is a means for formally obtaining and disseminating information so that decisions can be made by importing countries as to whether they wish to receive future shipments of certain chemicals and for ensuring compliance with these decisions by exporting countries. The Convention promotes shared responsibility between exporting and importing countries in protecting human health and the environment from the harmful effects of such chemicals and provides for the exchange of information about potentially hazardous chemicals that may be exported and imported. A key goal of the Rotterdam PIC Convention is to provide technical assistance for developing countries and countries with economies in transition to develop the infrastructure and capacity necessary to implement the provisions of the Convention. Substances covered under the Convention: Mercury compounds including inorganic and organometallic mercury compounds.

Helsinki Commission

The Helsinki Commission was created in 1974 to decrease mercury emissions to the Baltic Sea.

Barcelona Commission

The Barcelona Commission was created in 1974 to reduce mercury emissions to the Mediterranean Sea.

The Great Lakes Water Quality Agreement

The Great Lakes Water Quality Agreement started between US and Canada in 1972 and was designed to limit various pollutants in the lakes, including mercury.

The North Sea Directive

The North Sea Directive between Denmark, Belgium, France, Germany, Switzerland, The Netherlands, Norway, Sweden, and the United Kingdom was created to reduce the amount of mercury going into the North Sea.

=== UNEP Global Mercury Negotiation and Partnership ===
==== Global Legally Binding Instrument on Mercury ====
In February 2009, the Governing Council of UNEP agreed on the need to develop a global legally binding instrument on mercury. Participation in the intergovernmental negotiating committee (INC) is open to all Governments. Following the conclusion of the negotiations, the text will be open for signature at a diplomatic conference (Conference of Plenipotentiaries), which was held in 2013 in Japan.

==== UNEP Global Mercury Partnership Action Priorities ====
Most of the priorities for action to reduce risk from mercury have been defined within partnerships:

- Reducing Mercury in Artisanal and Small-Scale Gold Mining:

Artisanal and small-scale gold mining (ASGM) is a complex global development issue. Reaching out to individual miners is challenging, with an estimated 10-15 million artisanal and small-scale gold miners globally in approximately 70 countries. ASGM is the largest demand sector for mercury globally (estimated at 650-1000 tonnes in 2005). Low mercury and mercury free solutions are available.

- Mercury Control from Coal Combustion:

Burning of coal is the largest single anthropogenic source of mercury air emissions. Coal burning for power generation is increasing. Although coal contains only small concentrations of mercury, it is burnt in very large volumes. Household burning of coal is also a significant source of mercury emissions and a health hazard. The objective of this partnership area is continued minimization and elimination of mercury releases from coal combustion where possible.

- Mercury Reduction in the Chlor-alkali Sector:

Mercury cell chlor-alkali production is a significant user of mercury and a source of mercury releases to the environment. The mercury used in this process acts as a catalyst in the chlorine production process. Best practices, such as proper waste management, can minimize the release of mercury. Mercury-free technologies are also available in chlor-alkali production.

- Mercury Reduction in Products:

Transition success has been demonstrated in thermometers, switches and relays, batteries other than button cells, thermostats, HID auto discharge lamps, and sphygmomanometers. Reducing mercury in products may be the most effective means to control mercury in waste. Sound management should consider all stages of the product's life-cycle. Clear regulation can prompt manufacturers to produce mercury-free products.

- Mercury Air Transport and Fate Research:

Fate and transport research is important in setting and implementing national, regional and global priorities. It also helps establish baselines to monitor and assess progress on mercury reductions.

- Mercury Waste Management:

The management of mercury and mercury-containing waste is the last step in the product life-cycle. The elimination of mercury in products and processes may be the most efficient way to avoid the presence of any form of mercury in waste.

- Mercury Supply and Storage:

Mercury is an element and cannot be destroyed. Policies designed to decrease the production, use and trade of mercury must be accompanied by access to viable, safe and secure long term storage. Investing in supply, trade, and storage issue is more efficient than trying to control mercury release.

==== Toolkit for Identification and Quantification of Mercury Releases ====
The "Toolkit for identification and quantification of mercury releases", the "Mercury Toolkit", is intended to assist countries to develop a mercury releases inventory. It provides a standardized methodology and accompanying database enabling the development of consistent national and regional mercury inventories. National inventories will assist countries to identify and address mercury releases.

== See also ==
- Mercury-Containing and Rechargeable Battery Management Act
- Got Mercury? (public awareness campaign)
- Mercury in fish
- Mercury poisoning
