= SPAWN =

US nonprofit environmental organization

SPAWN, the Salmon Protection and Watershed Network, is a project of the Turtle Island Restoration Network (TIRN), a United States 501(c)(3) nonprofit environmental organization.

SPAWN's stated mission is to "protect endangered salmon in the Lagunitas Creek Watershed and the environment on which we all depend." SPAWN uses a multi-faceted approach to accomplish their mission including grassroots action, habitat restoration, policy development, research and monitoring, citizen training, environmental education, strategic litigation, and collaboration with other organizations and agencies.

== Lagunitas Creek watershed ==
The Lagunitas Creek watershed in Marin County, California, has been identified as the most important spawning and rearing habitat for wild coho salmon left in California. Coho in the Central California Evolutionarily Significant Unit (CCCESU) are a Federal and State listed Endangered Species considered to be "in imminent danger of extinction."

Despite having the best run of wild coho left in the State, estimated at up to 30 percent of the State’s total in 2007, only on average 500 adult salmon currently return each year to spawn here. The Lagunitas Creek Watershed is also important habitat for federally listed steelhead and California freshwater shrimp.

SPAWN performs its work with the assistance of volunteer and pro bono contributions. Many dedicated individuals in the San Geronimo Valley, Marin County, and the greater San Francisco Bay Area have made a lasting impact on the accomplishments and history of SPAWN.

== History ==
The seeds of SPAWN, the Salmon Protection And Watershed Network, were planted when biologist Todd Steiner, the founder, discovered migrating coho salmon stuck at Roy’s Dam in 1997 on the San Geronimo Valley Golf Course, unable to migrate upstream to spawn and complete their amazing life history. Steiner contacted the media to expose the plight of these recently listed endangered species and contacting National Marine Fisheries Service (NMFS) asking for an emergency permit to move the fish above the crumbling dam obstruction.

That night on the news, the plight of the salmon was beamed into Bay Area homes on five TV stations. Steiner set up his young son’s painting easel at Roy’s Dam with a hastily written petition asking for government action, as hundreds of people came forward to witness the spectacle first hand, sign the petition, and offer help. Residents, the general public, NGOs and government agencies came together to fix the immediate problem and Roy’s Dam was transformed into Roy’s Pools.

SPAWN has grown from an all-volunteer organization to one with a full-time staff who coordinate the work of hundreds of volunteers and interns. In 1999 SPAWN was incorporated as a program under the umbrella of the non-profit 501(c)(3) environmental organization Turtle Island Restoration Network (TIRN).

== Programs ==
SPAWN drives seven active programs and campaigns that focus on protecting endangered salmon and the Lagunitas Creek Watershed. These include habitat restoration, fish rescue, citizen training, creek monitoring, creek walks, land acquisition and water conservation.

=== Habitat restoration ===
Each year SPAWN volunteers contribute many hundreds of hours towards restoring streamside habitat in the Lagunitas Creek Watershed. Volunteers work to plant native trees and understory plants, and remove invasive species. In 2005 SPAWN launched a community-based native plant nursery program that serves to grow thousands of native plants to support local restoration programs and provide plants to landowners living along stream corridors in the San Geronimo Valley.

=== Fish rescue ===
SPAWN’s fish rescue program focuses on fish relocation efforts within the San Geronimo Valley in the Lagunitas Creek Watershed. Streams are surveyed and as it becomes apparent that pools will dry completely, and based on previous years observations at known sites, relocation efforts begin. Relocation usually begins in June but can start as early as April depending on creek flows and rainfall. Over 15,000 juvenile coho and steelhead have been saved from imminent mortality since this effort began in 1999. Rescue and relocation efforts take place under State and Federal permits.

=== Citizen training ===
SPAWN organizes and facilitates a number of citizen training programs that includes a Creek Naturalist Training, native plant collection and propagation, salmon seminar series, spawning salmon surveying and water quality monitoring.

=== Creek monitoring ===
SPAWN oversees a number of creek monitoring programs including water quality monitoring, out-migrant salmon smolt monitoring, and spawning salmon monitoring. Each year SPAWN also responds to many calls from concerned citizens about problems or emergencies on their property or at large. Staff and volunteers respond to these calls and help refer problems to the appropriate agencies if necessary or find ways to prevent or repair the problem.

=== Creek walks ===
During the winter season (Nov-Jan) SPAWN organizes weekly creek walks in the Lagunitas Creek Watershed for the public to view spawning salmon and provide education on watershed management issues. The walks are led by volunteer Naturalists that are trained through SPAWN’s annual Creek Naturalist Training Program each October.

=== Land acquisition ===
SPAWN’s land acquisition program is focused on efforts to protect riparian habitat along the Lagunitas Creek Watershed from increased development. SPAWN is promoting the creation of a land conservancy to protect the riparian habitat through land acquisition and conservation easements on private parcels along the watershed.

=== Water conservation ===
SPAWN’s water conservation program is focused on reducing the impacts of stormwater runoff on local streams and ensuring adequate in stream flow and spawning and rearing habitat for coho salmon and steelhead in the Lagunitas Creek. In partnership with the Marin Community Foundation, SPAWN recently launched a community-based program, the Marin County Stormwater Catchment & Water Conservation Initiative, to provide technical support, cost-share support and incentives to landowners who reduce runoff from their properties using roof-water harvesting techniques.

== Accomplishments ==
Since SPAWN’s beginnings in 1996 the program has achieved a number of accomplishments:

- In 2008 SPAWN received the coveted Peter Behr Award from the Environmental Action Committee of West Marin and the prestigious Ted Wellman Award from the Marin Conservation League for their efforts towards preserving the coho salmon and their habitat.
- Identifying and documenting the importance of the San Geronimo Valley that makes up only 10% of the Lagunitas Creek Watershed but upwards of 40% of the spawning habitat and 30% of the young fish that rear in the Lagunitas Creek Watershed do so in this valley.
- Documenting the continued degradation of this critical habitat in the San Geronimo Valley from the impacts of human development from hydrological disruption, and inputs of septic sewage, pesticides and sediment through water quality monitoring and on-the-ground habitat assessments.
- Developing an environmental education program that has trained and organized hundreds of volunteers to learn and participate in habitat restoration techniques.
- Re-creating and repairing riparian habitat on private and public lands and educating local landowners in sound fish-friendly living practices.
- Growing a native plant nursery to provide local genetic stock plant material for restoration activities.
- Installing and developing rain catchment systems and rain gardens at individual homes and at local schools through its Rain Harvesting Program.
- Convincing Marin County, California, to conduct a cumulative impact analysis of development on the salmon in the San Geronimo Valley and to place a two-year moratorium on construction in the 100-foot riparian (creek) corridors.
- Helping defeat the Marin Municipal Water District's efforts to expand the Russian River Pipeline and import more water to Marin County, which would have impacted salmon populations in the Russian River and Eel River watersheds.

== See also ==
- Got Mercury?
- Sea Turtle Restoration Project
