= Mercury in fish =

Potential hazard from consuming fish

Nearby anthropogenic sources, such as coal burning and iron mining, can contaminate water sources with methylmercury, which is efficiently absorbed in the bodies of fish. Through the process of biomagnification, mercury levels in each successive predatory stage increase.

The presence of mercury in fish is a health concern for people who eat them, especially for women who are or may become pregnant, nursing mothers, and young children. Fish and shellfish concentrate mercury in their bodies, often in the form of methylmercury, a highly toxic organomercury compound. This element is known to bioaccumulate in humans, so bioaccumulation in seafood carries over into human populations, where it can result in mercury poisoning. Mercury is dangerous to both natural ecosystems and humans because it is a metal known to be highly toxic, especially due to its neurotoxic ability to damage the central nervous system.

In human-controlled ecosystems of fish, usually done for market production of wanted seafood species, mercury clearly rises through the food chain via fish consuming small plankton, as well as through non-food sources such as underwater sediment.

Fish products have been shown to contain varying amounts of heavy metals, particularly mercury and fat-soluble pollutants from water pollution. Species of fish that are long-lived and high on the food chain, such as marlin, tuna, shark, swordfish, king mackerel and tilefish contain higher concentrations of mercury than others. Cetaceans (whales and dolphins) also bioaccumulate mercury and other pollutants, so populations that eat whale meat, such as the Japanese, Icelanders, Norwegians and the Faroese, are also vulnerable to mercury ingestion.

== Biomagnification ==
The consumption of fish is by far the most significant source of ingestion-related mercury exposure in humans and animals. Mercury and methyl mercury are present in only very small concentrations in seawater. However, they are absorbed, usually as methyl mercury, by algae at the start of the food chain. This algae is then eaten by fish and other organisms higher in the food chain. Fish efficiently absorb methyl mercury, but excrete it very slowly. Instead, it accumulates, primarily in the viscera, although also in the muscle tissue. This results in the bioaccumulation of mercury, in a buildup in the adipose tissue of successive trophic levels: zooplankton, small nekton, larger fish, and so on. The older that such fish become, the more mercury they may have absorbed. Anything that eats these fish within the food chain also consumes the higher level of mercury that the fish have accumulated, including humans. This process explains why predatory fish such as swordfish and sharks or birds like osprey and eagles have higher concentrations of mercury in their tissue than could be accounted for by direct exposure alone. Species on the food chain can amass body concentrations of mercury up to ten times higher than the species they consume. This process is called biomagnification. For example, herring contains mercury levels at about 0.1 parts per million, while shark contains mercury levels greater than 1 part per million.

== Origins of mercury pollution ==
=== Terrestrial mercury pollution ===
There are three types of mercury emission: anthropogenic, re-emission, and natural, including volcanoes and geothermal vents. Anthropogenic sources are responsible for 30% of all emissions, while natural sources are responsible for 10%, and re-emission accounts for the other 60%. While re-emission accounts for the largest proportion of emissions, it is likely that the mercury emitted from these sources originally came from anthropogenic sources.

Anthropogenic sources include coal burning, cement production, oil refining, artisan and small-scale gold mining, wastes from consumer products, dental amalgam, the chlor-alkali industry, production of vinyl chloride, and the mining, smelting, and production of iron and other metals. The total amount of mercury released by mankind in 2010 was estimated to be 1,960 metric tons. The majority of this comes from coal burning and gold mining, accounting for 24% and 37% of total anthropogenic output, respectively.

Re-emission, the largest emitter, occurs in a variety of ways. It is possible for mercury that has been deposited in soil to be re-emitted into the mercury cycle via floods. A second example of re-emission is a forest fire; mercury that has been absorbed into plant life is re-released into the atmosphere. While it is difficult to estimate the exact extent of mercury re-emission, it is an important field of study. Knowing how easily and how often previously emitted mercury can be released helps us learn how long it will take for a reduction in anthropogenic sources to be reflected in the environment. Mercury that has been released can find its way into the oceans. A 2008 model estimated the total amount of deposition into the oceans that year to be 3,700 metric tons. It is estimated that rivers carry as much as 2,420 metric tons. Much of the mercury deposited in the oceans is re-emitted, however; as much as 300 metric tons is converted into methyl mercury. While only 13% of this finds its way into the food chain, that is still 40 metric tons a year.

Much (an estimated 40%) of the mercury that eventually finds its way into fish originates with coal-burning power plants and chlorine production plants. The largest source of mercury contamination in the United States is coal-fueled power plant emissions. Chlorine chemical plants use mercury to extract chlorine from salt, which in many parts of the world is discharged as mercury compounds in waste water, though this process has been largely replaced by the more economically viable membrane cell process, which does not use mercury. Coal contains mercury as a natural contaminant. When it is fired for electricity generation, the mercury is released as smoke into the atmosphere. Most of this mercury pollution can be eliminated if pollution-control devices are installed.

Mercury in the United States frequently comes from power plants, which release about 50% of the nation's mercury emissions. In other countries, such as Ghana, gold mining often uses mercury compounds, leading to workers receiving significant quantities of mercury while performing their jobs. Such mercury from gold mines is specifically known to contribute to biomagnification in aquatic food chains.

Elemental mercury often comes from coal power plants, and oxidized mercury often comes from incinerators. Oil-fired power plants also contribute mercury to the environment. The energy industry therefore is a key player in the introduction of mercury into the environment. When addressing the issue of reducing seafood mercury bioaccumulation on a global scale, it is important to pinpoint major energy producers and consumers whose exchange of energy may be the root of the problem.

=== Aquatic mercury pollution ===
The farming of aquatic organisms, known as aquaculture, often involves fish feed that contains mercury. A study by Jardine has found no reliable connection between mercury in fish food affecting aquaculture organisms or aquatic organisms in the wild. Even so, mercury from other sources may affect organisms grown through aquaculture. In China, farmed fish species, such as bighead carp, mud carp, and Siniperca chuatsi, carried 90% of total mercury content in all of the measured fish in a study by Cheng. This study also concluded that mercury bioaccumulates through food chains even in controlled aquaculture environments. Both total mercury and methyl mercury absorption was found to be derived from sediments containing mercury, not mainly from fish feed.

The Hawaii Institute of Marine Biology has noted that fish feed used in aquaculture often contains heavy metals such as mercury, lead, and arsenic, and has dispatched these concerns to organizations such as the Food and Agriculture Organization of the United Nations.

Mercury can get into freshwater systems by point sources and extended flooding. In Canada, mercury poisoning in Grassy Narrows was likely caused by a spill at a paper mill, which is a point source. Non-point sources include floods that create hospitable habitats for bacteria that can convert mercury to methylmercury, which is the toxic form that bioaccumulates through aquatic food webs. The effects of these different sources of mercury have been studied at the Experimental Lakes Area in Ontario, Canada, using research procedures including whole-lake ecosystem experiments and non-lethal fish muscle biopsies.

=== Controlling output of mercury pollution sources ===
The U.S. Geological Survey (USGS) projects that in the next several decades there will be a 50 percent increase in mercury levels. The study also shows that the increases are connected through industrial emissions and are not natural as previously thought. Therefore, by decreasing emissions from industrial plants, the possibility of decreasing the high level of mercury remains plausible. Several nations are currently implementing systems that will detect and therefore later be able to control the output of mercury into the atmosphere. Air pollution control devices (APCDs) have been implemented in South Korea as the government is starting to take inventory of mercury sources. Mercury pollution can also be removed by electrostatic precipitators (ESPs). Bag-based filters are also used in factories that may contribute mercury to the environment. Flue-gas desulfurization, normally used to eliminate sulfur dioxide, can also be used in conjunction with APCDs to remove additional mercury before exhausts are released into the environment. Even so, countries such as South Korea have only begun to use inventories of mercury sources, calling into question how fast anti-mercury measures will be put into factories.

== Health effects and outcomes ==
=== Disparate impacts ===
Mercury content in fish does not affect all populations equally. Certain ethnic groups, as well as young children, are more likely to suffer the effects of methyl mercury poisoning. In the United States, Wallace gathered data that indicated 16.9% of women who self-identify as Native American, Asian, Pacific Islander, or multiracial exceed the recommended reference dose of mercury. A study done on children of the Faroe Islands in the North Atlantic showed neurological problems stemming from mothers consuming pilot whale meat during pregnancy (see Whaling in the Faroe Islands). A 2020 NBER paper found that in coastal Colombia, those born during periods when fish catches have high mercury content have worse educational and labor market outcomes than those born during periods of low mercury content in fish.

==== Regulation and health ====
While various studies have shown high concentrations of mercury accumulated in fish, medical cases often go unreported and pose a difficulty in correlating mercury in fish with human poisoning. Environmental issues cover a broad range of areas, but medical cases that are associated with pollutants released into the environment by factories or construction areas cause public health issues that affect not only the environment but also human well-being. Substances poisonous to the human body in a particular amount or dose may not cause any symptoms over time. While there are limits to how much of anything the body can have, mercury is a particular poison that produces immediate physical symptoms when the body has been accumulating it over a period of time.

In the United States, the Environmental Protection Agency (EPA) estimates the amount of mercury in human blood that is not likely to pose fatal health outcomes. The agency is in charge of enforcing regulations and policies that cover a range of environmental topics. Analysis of blood mercury concentrations in childbearing women has documented that exposure to methyl mercury (MeHg) occurs primarily through the consumption of fish. The U.S. Food and Drug Administration (FDA) highly recommends against pregnant women and young children consuming raw fish. Pregnant women and young children often lack strong immune systems and are more at risk for foodborne illnesses.

==== Medical cases and exposure to mercury ====
In the United States, EPA provides advice about the levels of mercury that are non-fatal in humans. Symptoms of exposure to high levels of methyl mercury include disturbed vision, hearing, and speech, lack of coordination, and muscle weakness. Medical studies have examined the correlation of fish consumption and health issues. American studies have presented evidence of fish consumption and its effects on child development. Longitudinal studies agree that human activities release mercury that accumulates in marine life. Addressing the issues of fish consumption forces health officials to recognize the sources of mercury in the human body. Specific Native American tribes are vulnerable to a high exposure of mercury. Studies have determined that these native peoples in the U.S. suffer more from mercury poisoning and illness than any other cohort group in the country. This is due to the fact that fish is a main source of protein. Exposure risk was assessed through a medical study, thus raising judicial issues of whether the public health of these groups is a priority in the United States.

==== Children and exposure ====
Even in countries that have phased out mercury in the dental industry and manufacturing, such as Sweden, lingering quantities of mercury still exist in lakes and coastal areas. Moreover, global contributions of mercury to the environment also affect that country. A study in Sweden selected 127 women who had a high level of fish consumption. Around 20% of the women selected, after hair and blood samples, were found to have exceeded the EPA-recommended reference dose of 0.1 micrograms of methyl mercury per kilogram of body weight. Additionally, the study concluded that there was "no margin of safety for neuraldevelopmental effects in fetus[es]" without removing the offending species of fish from the diets of the women. This indicates that families intending to raise children should be especially careful about exposing their unborn babies to mercury via fish.

Children exposed to mercury are particularly susceptible to poisoning since the ratio of food, water, and air intake versus individual body weight is much higher than that of adults. Additionally, children undergo fast growth that causes them to be more susceptible to damaging exposure to methylmercury, as well as the long term consequences of such exposure during childhood development. Young age plays an important role in terms of damage caused by mercury, and much literature on mercury focuses on pregnant women and specific precautions designed to prevent youth mercury exposure. Prenatal methylmercury exposure does cause behavioral problems in infants and worsened cognitive test performance. Additionally, Hughner estimates that 250,000 women may be exposing their unborn babies to levels of methyl mercury above recommended federal levels.

Economically, there does not seem to be a difference in mercury exposure based on socioeconomic bracket and the ability to buy fish from the market. One study shows "no significant differences in mercury levels in tuna, bluefish, and flounder as a function of type of store or economic neighborhood".

==== By nation ====
Certain countries have cultural differences that lead to more fish consumption and therefore more possible exposure to seafood methylmercury. In Ghana, the local population traditionally consumes large quantities of fish, leading to potentially dangerous amounts of mercury in the bloodstream.

In the Lower Amazon, mercury contamination in fish is driven by anthropogenic activities such as gold mining and deforestation, which release mercury into aquatic ecosystems. Studies report mercury concentrations in fish muscle tissue ranging from 0.01 to 0.67 μg/g, with carnivorous species like Plagioscion squamosissimus showing higher levels due to biomagnification, sometimes exceeding the World Health Organization's safety threshold of 0.5 μg/g. Local communities relying on fish as a dietary staple face potential health risks from mercury exposure. Mercury levels in aquatic species, including fish and shrimp (Macrobrachium amazonicum), indicate broader environmental contamination, particularly near mining areas. In the Amazonian Basin, during the rainy season, herbivorous fish dominate the diet of 72.2% of the women selected from a particular Amazonian village. Analysis also shows increase of mercury content in the hair of humans who eat fish on a daily basis in the Amazon. Recent evidence from western Pará shows that multiple fish species consumed by riverine communities contain elevated concentrations of mercury. Several carnivorous species surpassed international guideline values for mercury in fish tissue, and risk assessments based on local consumption patterns indicated that frequent fish consumers may exceed tolerable daily mercury intake. These findings reinforce concerns about chronic dietary exposure to methylmercury in Amazonian regions affected by gold mining activities.

The most serious case of mercury poisoning in recent history was in the Japanese city of Minamata, in the 1950s. Minamata poisoning demonstrated that significant prenatal and postnatal exposure to high levels of methylmercury caused serious neurological problems. Minamata victims also showed higher than normal signs of psychiatric diseases, along with those diseases being caused by underlying neurological issues.

A 2014 USGS survey of mercury levels in the United States water system found that methylmercury concentrations in fish were typically highest in wetland areas including the coastal plain streams in the Southeast. Fish methylmercury levels were also high in the Western US, but only in streams that had been mined for mercury or gold.

=== Minamata disease ===
In the 1950s, inhabitants of the seaside town of Minamata, on Kyushu island in Japan, noticed strange behavior in animals. Cats would exhibit nervous tremors, dance, and scream. Within a few years, this was observed in other animals; birds would drop out of the sky. Symptoms were also observed in fish, an important component of the diet, especially for the poor. When human symptoms started to be noticed around 1956 an investigation began. Fishing was officially banned in 1957. It was found that the Chisso Corporation, a petrochemical company and maker of plastics such as vinyl chloride, had been discharging heavy metal waste into the sea for decades. They used mercury compounds as catalysts in their syntheses. It is believed that about 5,000 people were killed and perhaps 50,000 were to some extent poisoned by mercury. Mercury poisoning in Minamata, Japan, is now known as Minamata disease.

=== Seafood consumption benefits ===
The American College of Obstetricians and Gynecologists noted that, considering all the dangers and benefits, the overall result of eating fish in the United States is likely to improve personal health rather than damage it. The College argues that the omega-3 polyunsaturated fatty acids found in fish have a health benefit that outweighs the harm from mercury or polychlorinated biphenyls. Even so, the College suggested limiting fish consumption for pregnant women. A risk-benefit study weighing the risks of mercury consumption against the benefits derived from fish in Alaska showed that the benefits outweigh the risks when consuming salmon for both cardiovascular health and infant neurological development, and that methyl mercury data for non-oily fish need to be of high quality before relative risk can be reliably identified. The Seychelles Child Development Study traced more than seven hundred mother-child pairs for nine years and found no neurological problems in the children resulting from both prenatal and postnatal methylmercury exposure. A study done with marketed fish in Oman concluded that, except in a few rare cases, the fish available for consumption had lower levels of mercury than limits defined by various health organizations. Some, citing these studies, have suggested the creation of place-based consumption advisories. However place-based approaches do not take into account cases of severe mercury poisoning, such as that found in Minamata disease.

Selenium is an element that is known to counteract some of the dangers of ingesting mercury. Multiple studies have been done, such as those in New Jersey and Sweden, that take into account selenium as well as mercury levels. Fish often do contain selenium in conjunction with bioaccumulated mercury, which may offset some of the dangers associated with the mercury ingested.

== Levels of contamination ==
=== Most-contaminated fish species ===
The danger level from consuming fish depends on species and size. Size is the best predictor of increased levels of accumulated mercury. Sharks, such as the mako shark, have very high levels of mercury. A study on New Jersey coastal fish indicated that one third of the sampled fish had levels of mercury above 0.5 parts per million, a level that could pose a human health concern for consumers who regularly eat this fish. Another study of marketplace fish caught in waters surrounding Southern Italy showed that, undoubtedly, greater fish weight leads to additional mercury found in fish body tissues. Moreover, the concentration, measured in milligrams of mercury per kilogram of fish, steadily increases with the size of the fish. Anglerfish off the coast of Italy were found with concentrations as high as 2.2 milligrams of mercury per kilogram, higher than the recommended limit of 1 milligram of mercury per kilogram. Annually, Italy catches approximately a third of its fish from the Adriatic Sea, where these anglerfish were found.

Fish that consume their prey in a certain manner may contain much higher concentrations of mercury than other species. Grass carp off the coast of China hold far less internal mercury than do bighead carp. The reason for this is that bighead carp are filter feeders, while grass carp are not. Thus, bighead carp gather more mercury by eating large amounts of small plankton, as well as sucking up sediments that collect a sizable amount of methyl mercury.

Mercury levels in commercial fish and shellfish (Note: The mercury levels in the table, unless otherwise indicated, are taken from the US FDA.) (Note: Trophic levels and maximum ages are, unless otherwise indicated, taken from the relevant species pages on Rainer Froese and Daniel Pauly (Eds) (2012). Where a group has more than one species, the average of the principal commercial species is used.)
Species	Median (ppm)	Mean (ppm)	Std dev (ppm)	Trophic level	Max age (years)	Comment
Tilefish (Gulf of Mexico)	—N/a	1.123	—N/a	3.6	35	Mid-Atlantic tilefish (rather than Gulf of Mexico tilefish) has lower mercury levels and is considered safe to eat in moderation.
Swordfish	0.870	0.995	0.539	4.5	15	
Shark	0.811	0.979	0.626			
Mackerel (king)	—N/a	0.730	—N/a	4.5	14	
Tuna (bigeye)	0.560	0.689	0.341	4.5	11	Fresh/frozen
Orange roughy	0.562	0.571	0.183	4.3	149	
Marlin (Note: Only methylmercury was analyzed (all other results are for total mercury))	0.390	0.485	0.237	4.5		
Mackerel (Spanish)	—N/a	0.454	—N/a	4.5	5	Gulf of Mexico
Grouper	0.399	0.448	0.278	4.2		All species
Tuna	0.340	0.386	0.265			All species, fresh/frozen
Bluefish	0.305	0.368	0.221	4.5	9	
Sablefish	0.265	0.361	0.241	3.8	94	
Tuna (albacore)	0.360	0.358	0.138	4.3	9	Fresh/frozen
Tuna (yellowfin)	0.311	0.354	0.231	4.3	9	Fresh/frozen
Patagonian toothfish	0.303	0.354	0.299	4.0	50+	Chilean sea bass
Tuna (albacore)	0.338	0.350	0.128	4.3	9	Canned
Croaker white	0.280	0.287	0.069	3.4		Pacific
Halibut	0.188	0.241	0.225	4.3		
Weakfish	0.157	0.235	0.216	3.8	17	Sea trout
Scorpionfish	0.181	0.233	0.139			
Mackerel (Spanish)	—N/a	0.182	—N/a	4.5		South Atlantic
Mahi-mahi	0.180	0.178	0.103			
Bass	0.094	0.167	0.194	3.9		Striped, black, and black sea
Snapper	0.113	0.166	0.244			
Monkfish	0.139	0.161	0.095	4.5	25	
Perch	0.146	0.150	0.112	4.0		Freshwater
Tuna (skipjack)	0.150	0.144	0.119	3.8	12	Fresh/frozen
Tilefish (Atlantic)	0.099	0.144	0.122	3.6	35	
Skate	—N/a	0.137	—N/a			
Buffalofish	0.120	0.137	0.094			
Tuna	0.077	0.126	0.134			All species, canned, light
Perch (ocean)	0.102	0.121	0.125			
Cod	0.066	0.111	0.152	3.9	22	
Carp	0.134	0.110	0.099			
Lobster (American)	0.086	0.107	0.076			
Pickerel (American)	0.091	0.095	0.100			
Lobster (spiny)	0.062	0.093	0.097			
Sheephead (California)	0.080	0.090	0.050			
Whitefish	0.067	0.089	0.084			
Mackerel (chub)	—N/a	0.088	—N/a	3.1		Pacific
Jacksmelt	0.050	0.081	0.103	3.1		
Hake	0.067	0.079	0.064	4.0		
Herring	0.042	0.078	0.128	3.2	21	
Trout	0.025	0.071	0.141			Freshwater
Croaker (Atlantic)	0.061	0.065	0.050			
Crab	0.050	0.065	0.096			Blue, king and snow crab
Butterfish	—N/a	0.058	—N/a	3.5		
Flatfish	0.050	0.056	0.045			Flounder, plaice and sole
Haddock	0.049	0.055	0.033			Atlantic
Whiting	0.052	0.051	0.030			
Mackerel (Atlantic)	—N/a	0.050	—N/a			
Mullet	0.014	0.050	0.078			
Shad (American)	0.033	0.038	0.045			
Crayfish	0.035	0.032	0.012			
Pollock	0.003	0.031	0.089			
Squid	0.017	0.024	0.023			
Catfish	0.005	0.024	0.056	3.9	24	
Salmon	0.015	0.022	0.034			Fresh/frozen
Anchovies	0.011	0.016	0.015	3.1		
Salmon	0.010	0.014	0.021			Canned
Sardine	0.010	0.013	0.015	2.7		
Tilapia	0.004	0.013	0.023			
Oyster	< 0.001	0.012	0.035			
Clam	0.002	0.009	0.011			
Shrimp	0.001	0.009	0.013		6.5	
Scallop	< 0.001	0.003	0.007			

US government scientists tested fish in 291 streams around the country for mercury contamination. They found mercury in every fish tested, according to the study by the U.S. Department of the Interior. They found mercury even in fish of isolated rural waterways. Twenty-five percent of the fish tested had mercury levels above the safety levels determined by EPA for people who eat the fish regularly.

== Legislation ==
=== Japan ===
Since the Minamata disaster, Japan has improved on its mercury regulation. During the 1970s Japan made strides to reduce mercury demand and production. Chief among these efforts was the reduction of inorganic mercury produced by mines. It was halted by 1974, and demand fell from 2,500 tons per year in 1964, its peak, to 10 tons per year in recent years. Since these initial strides, Japan has introduced a list of regulations governing the mercury content of a variety of materials.

Japan Mercury Regulation
Category	Regulation	Result
Cosmetics	Pharmaceutical Affairs Act	Ban the use of mercury and its compounds
Agriculture	Agricultural Chemicals Control Act	Ban the use of mercury and its compounds as an active ingredient
Household Commodities	Act on Control of Household Products Containing Hazardous Substances	No mercury in household adhesives, household paints, household wax, shoe polish, shoe cream, diapers, bibs, undergarments, gloves, and socks
Pharmaceutical Products	Pharmaceutical Affairs Act	No use of mercury compounds in oral preparations. No use of mercury compounds, other than mercurochrome, as an active ingredient. Mercury as a preservative only if no other option is available.
Air	Air Pollution Control Law	No more than 40 ng/m^{3}
Water	Basic Environment Law and Water Pollution Control Act	Environmental quality standard: no more than 0.0005 mg/L in waterway and ground water. Effluent standard: no more than 0.005 mg/L in effluence.
Soil	Basic Environment Law and Soil Contamination Countermeasures Act	Environmental quality standard: no more than 0.0005 mg/L sample solution. Elution standard: no more than 0.0005 mg/L. Content standard: no more than 15 mg/kg

Regulation of these potential sources of pollution reduces the amount of mercury that ends up in fish and, through biomagnification, in humans. In addition to enacting legislation controlling the mercury levels in potential pollutants, Japan has directly influenced the environment by issuing regulations setting acceptable levels of environmental mercury pollution.

It is Japan's goal to promote international mercury legislation in hopes of preventing any country from experiencing what it did. Despite Japan's extensive regulation and experience with mercury-based disasters, there is still little information provided to the public. The Japanese Federal Fish Advisory's recommendations are less strict than those in America.

=== United States ===
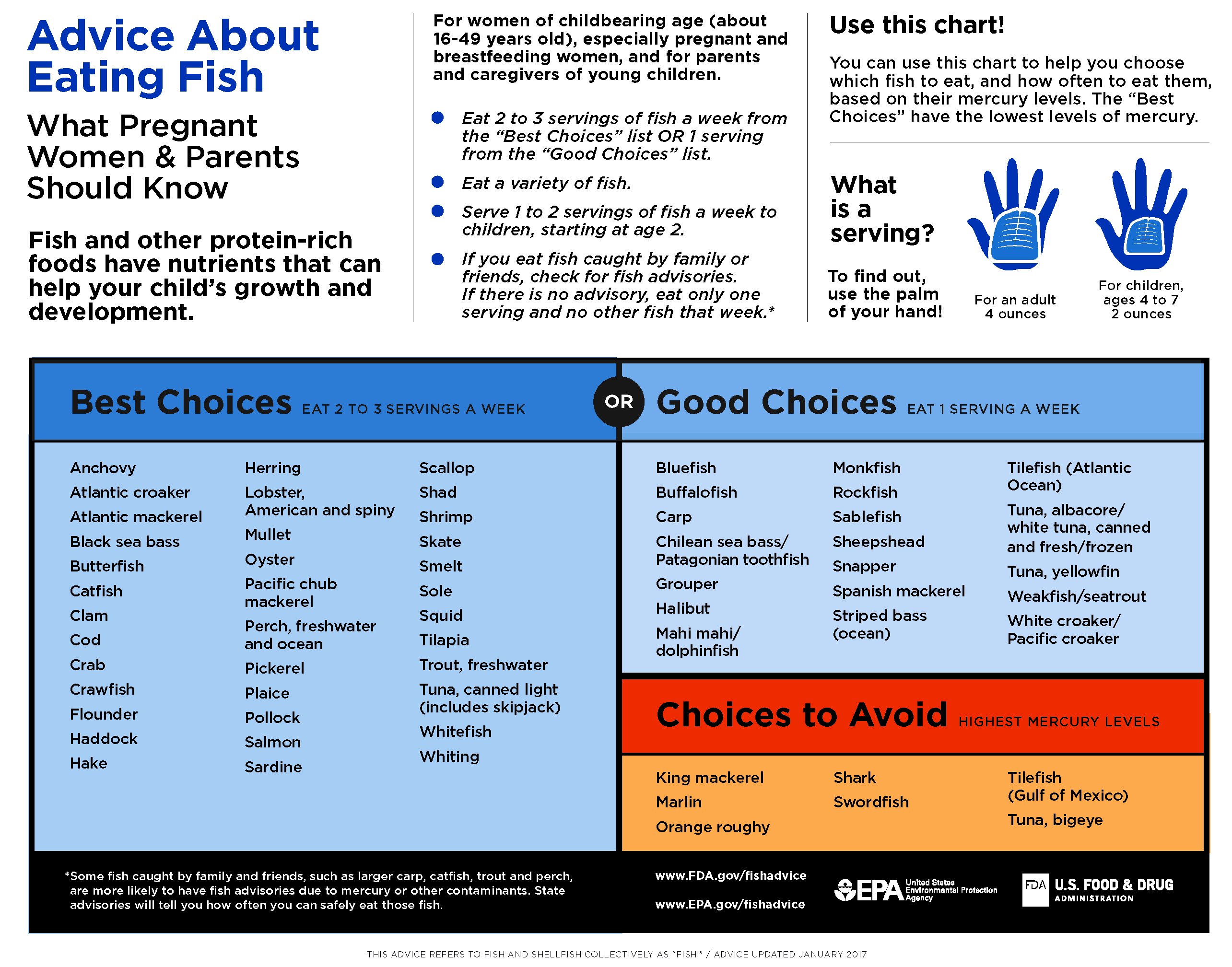
Fish advisory chart issued by U.S. Environmental Protection Agency and Food and Drug Administration

==== Air pollution regulations ====
The United States has regulated mercury emissions under the authority of the Clean Air Act.

EPA first attempted to regulate power plant mercury emissions with the Clean Air Mercury Rule in 2005. The George W. Bush administration intended for the regulation to use a cap-and-trade system to control emissions across multiple industries. The rule was challenged in litigation, and in 2008 the U.S. Court of Appeals for the District of Columbia Circuit vacated the rule, stating that EPA had improperly excluded power plants from designation as emitting hazardous air pollutants.

EPA subsequently classified mercury emissions from power plants as hazardous under section 112 of the Clean Air Act. The 2012 Mercury and Air Toxics Standards (MATS) regulation, issued by the Barack Obama administration, targets airborne mercury emissions from power plants and other stationary sources. Airborne mercury is dissolved in the oceans, where microorganisms convert waterborne mercury into methyl mercury, which enters the food chain and is stored in fish tissue.

EPA stated that the MATS regulation would prevent about 90% of power plant mercury. The agency estimated the total expected health benefits are estimated at $37 billion–$90 billion by 2016. EPA estimated the economic cost at $9.6 billion annually..

In 2020 the Trump administration weakened the MATS rule by disavowing EPA's previous calculations and justifications, thereby making the rule subject to legal challenges.

==== Wastewater regulations ====
EPA published wastewater regulations (effluent guidelines) for mercury in industrial categories where mercury is used in the manufacturing process, including battery manufacturing; inorganic chemicals manufacturing; oil and gas extraction (drilling fluids and cuttings); and nonferrous metals manufacturing (smelting).

=== European Union ===
In EU, the regulation (EU) 2017/852 covers the full life cycle of mercury. This legislation prohibits the manufacture, export and import of a large range of mercury-added products; puts an end to all uses of mercury catalysts and large electrodes in industrial processes and reduces the use of and pollution from dental amalgam. Recently, the EU estimated the Mercury content in the topsoils based on a large Land Cover Survey named LUCAS. The mercury content in EU topsoils has a median of 38 μg per Kg with a total content of around 45,000 tons in the 0–20 cm of EU.

=== International ===
Some believe that legislation on a global scale is needed for this issue because mercury pollution is estimated to be so far-reaching. Pollution from one country does not stay localized to that country. Despite this, international regulation has been slow to take off. The first forms of international legislation appeared in the 1970s, beginning as agreements about shared bodies of water. The next step was the Stockholm Declaration, which urged countries to avoid polluting the oceans by dumping. The 1972 Oslo Convention and the 1974 Paris Convention were adopted by parts of Europe. Both lessened polluting the ocean with mercury, the former by banning the dumping of ships and aircraft into the ocean and the latter by obligating participants to reduce land-based pollution on coastlines. The first real global legislation regarding mercury pollution was the Basel Convention of 1989. This convention attempts to reduce the movement of mercury across borders and primarily regulates the import and export of toxic chemicals, including mercury. In 1998 the Convention on Long-Range Transboundary Air Pollution was adopted by most of the European Union, the United States, and Canada. Its primary objective is to cut emissions of heavy metals. The convention is the largest international agreement on mercury established to date. In the early 21st century, the focus of mercury regulation has been on voluntary programs. The next phase in legislation is a global effort, and this appears to be what the Minamata Convention hopes to accomplish. The Minamata Convention, named after the Japanese city that suffered horribly from mercury pollution, has taken four years of negotiation but was finally adopted by delegates from over 140 countries. The convention was ratified after 50 countries signed it. The Minamata Convention requires all participants to eliminate, where possible, the release of mercury from small-scale gold mining. It also requires a sharp reduction in emission from coal burning.

== Current advice ==
The complexities associated with mercury transport and environmental fate are described by EPA in its 1997 Mercury Study Report to Congress. Because methyl mercury and high levels of elemental mercury can be particularly toxic to a fetus or young children, government agencies, including the EPA and FDA, recommend that women who are pregnant or plan to become pregnant within the next one or two years, as well as young children, avoid eating more than 6 ounces (170g, one average meal) of fish per week.

In the United States, the FDA established an action level for methylmercury in commercial marine and freshwater fish that is 1.0 parts per million (ppm). In Canada, the limit for the total of mercury content is 0.5 ppm. The "Got Mercury?" website (sponsored by Turtle Island Restoration Network, a non-profit organization) includes a calculator for determining mercury levels in fish.

Species with characteristically low levels of mercury include shrimp, tilapia, salmon, pollock, and catfish (FDA March 2004). The FDA characterizes shrimp, catfish, pollock, salmon, sardines, and canned light tuna as low-mercury seafood, although recent tests have indicated that up to 6 percent of canned light tuna may contain high levels. A study published in 2008 found that mercury distribution in tuna meat is inversely related to the lipid content, suggesting that the lipid concentration within edible tuna tissues has a diluting effect on mercury content. These findings suggest that choosing to consume a type of tuna that has a higher natural fat content may help reduce the amount of mercury intake, compared to consuming tuna with a low fat content. Also, many of the fish chosen for sushi contain high levels of mercury.

According to the FDA, the risk from mercury by eating fish and shellfish is not a health concern for most people. However, certain seafood might contain levels of mercury that may cause harm to an unborn baby (and especially its brain development and nervous system). In a young child, high levels of mercury can interfere with the development of the nervous system. The FDA provides three recommendations for young children, pregnant women, and women of child-bearing age:

1. Do not eat shark, swordfish, king mackerel, or tilefish (Gulf of Mexico) because they might contain high levels of mercury.
2. Eat up to 12 ounces (2 average meals of 170 g each) a week of a variety of fish and shellfish that are lower in mercury. Five of the most commonly eaten fish and shellfish that are low in mercury are: shrimp, canned light tuna, salmon, pollock, and catfish. Another commonly eaten fish, albacore or ("white") tuna depending on its origin might have more mercury than canned light tuna. So, when choosing your two meals of fish and shellfish, it is recommended that you should not eat more than up to 6 ounces (one average meal) of albacore tuna per week.
3. Check local advisories about the safety of fish caught by family and friends in your local lakes, rivers, and coastal areas. If no advice is available, eat up to 6 ounces (one average meal of 170 g) per week of fish you catch from local waters, but consume no other fish during that week.

Research suggests that selenium content in fish is protective against the toxic effects of methylmercury content. Fish with higher ratios of selenium to methylmercury (Se:Hg) are better to eat since the selenium binds to the methylmercury allowing it to pass through the body un-absorbed.

In 2012 the European Food Safety Authority (EFSA) reported on chemical contaminants they found in the food of over 20 European countries. They established that fish meat and fish products were primarily responsible for methylmercury in the diet of all age classes. Particularly implicated were swordfish, tuna, cod, pike, whiting and hake. The EFSA recommend a tolerable weekly intake for methylmercury of 1.3 μg/kg body weight.

== See also ==
- Diagnosis Mercury: Money, Politics and Poison
- Mercury pollution in the ocean
- Mercury in tuna
- Safe Harbor Certified Seafood
- Whale meat

== Additional sources ==
- Kidd K and Batchelar K (2011) "Mercury" In: Wood CM, Farrell AP and Brauner CJ, Fish Physiology: Homeostasis and Toxicology of Non-Essential Metals, pp. 238–297. Academic Press. ISBN 9780123786340.
- Lubick, N. (2009). "Ocean mercury on the increase". Nature. doi:10.1038/news.2009.218.
- Rasmussen, RS; Nettleton, J; Morrissey, MT (2005). "A Review of Mercury in Seafood: special focus on tuna" (PDF). Journal of Aquatic Food Product Technology. 14 (4): 71–100. Bibcode:2005JAFPT..14d..71R. doi:10.1300/J030v14n04_06. S2CID 94568585. Archived from the original (PDF) on 2016-04-15.
