= Mercury-Containing and Rechargeable Battery Management Act =

United States law

- Other short titles: Rechargeable Battery Recycling Act; The Battery Act
- Long title: An Act to phase out the use of mercury in batteries and provide for the efficient and cost-effective collection and recycling or proper disposal of used nickel cadmium batteries, small sealed lead-acid batteries, and certain other batteries, and for other purposes.
- Acronyms (colloquial): MCRBMA
- Nicknames: Mercury-Containing Battery Management Act
- Enacted by: the 104th United States Congress
- Effective: May 13, 1996

Citations
- Public law: 104-142
- Statutes at Large: 110 Stat. 1329

Codification
- Titles amended: 42 U.S.C.: Public Health and Social Welfare
- U.S.C. sections created: 42 U.S.C. ch. 137 §§ 14301-14307

Legislative history
- Introduced in the House as H.R. 2024 by Scott L. Klug (R-WI) on July 12, 1995; Committee consideration by House Commerce; Passed the House on April 23, 1996 (agreed voice vote); Passed the Senate on April 25, 1996 (passed voice vote); Signed into law by President William J. Clinton on May 13, 1996

In the United States, the Mercury-Containing and Rechargeable Battery Management Act (the Battery Act) (Public law 104-142) was signed into law on May 13, 1996. The purpose of the law was to phase out the use of mercury in batteries and to provide for the efficient and cost-effective collection and recycling, or proper disposal, of used nickel cadmium batteries, small sealed lead-acid batteries, and certain other batteries.

== Effect ==
The intended objective of the Act was a reduction of heavy metals in municipal waste and in streams and ground water that resulted from the disposal of:

- Mercury in single-use (primary cell) batteries
- Toxic metal content such as lead from lead-acid batteries and the cadmium in rechargeable batteries, namely Ni-Cads

The sale of the first of these was banned (with the exception of the allowance of up to 25 mg of mercury per button cell) and the second family of products was given specific labeling and disposal requirements.

As a result, most retailers who sell rechargeable and other special batteries will take the old ones back for free recycling and safe disposal. The not-for-profit Rechargeable Battery Recycling Corporation (RBRC), used by most retailers, reclaims the metals within the old batteries to make new products such as batteries (mercury, cadmium, lead) and stainless steel (nickel).

== See also ==
- Got Mercury?, a United States public awareness campaign about levels of the element mercury in seafood
- Methylmercury
- Mercury poisoning, a disease caused by exposure to the element mercury or its toxic compounds
- Mercury regulation in the United States
- Mercury vacuum, a vacuum cleaner specifically designed to collect spills and vapors of the element mercury
- Minamata disease, industrial mercury pollution
- Niigata Minamata disease, industrial mercury pollution
