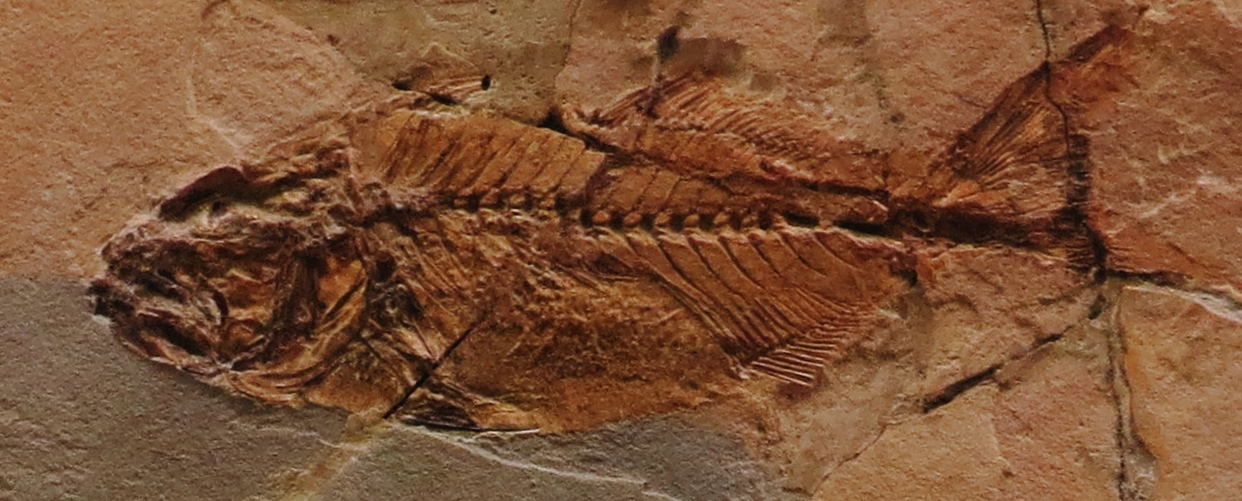
- Carangopsis brevis

Scientific classification
- Domain: Eukaryota
- Kingdom: Animalia
- Phylum: Chordata
- Class: Actinopterygii
- Order: Scombriformes
- Family: Pomatomidae
- Genus: †Carangopsis; Agassiz, 1844

Species
- †C. brevis (Blainville, 1818); †C. dorsalis Agassiz, 1844

= Carangopsis =

Carangopsis Temporal range: Early Eocene

Extinct genus of fishes

Carangopsis (from Greek: καραγέ caranx, 'scad/horse mackerel' and Greek: ὄψις opsis 'look') is an extinct relative of the bluefish that lived during the early Eocene. It contains two species, both from the famous Monte Bolca site of Italy.

The following species are known:

- †C. brevis (Blainville, 1818)
- †C. dorsalis Agassiz, 1844

Several other species (C. analis, C. latior, and C. maximus) were also described by Agassiz, but are no longer recognized.

== See also ==
- Prehistoric fish
- List of prehistoric bony fish
