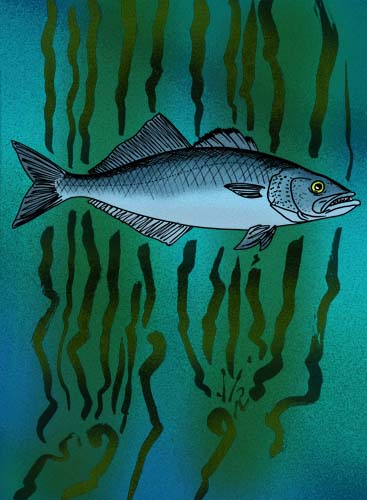
- Artist's reconstruction

Scientific classification
- Kingdom: Animalia
- Phylum: Chordata
- Class: Actinopterygii
- Order: Scombriformes
- Family: Pomatomidae
- Genus: †Lophar
- Species: †L. miocaenus

Binomial name
- †Lophar miocaenus Jordan and Gilbert

= Lophar =

Lophar Temporal range: Upper Miocene

Extinct genus of fishes

Lophar miocaenus is an extinct bony fish almost identical in form to the living bluefish, Pomatomus saltatrix, differing in its dentition, which consisted of "thick, conical subequal teeth" instead of the sharp, slender teeth and canines seen in bluefish. L. miocaenus lived during the Upper Miocene subepoch of Southern California.

== See also ==
- Prehistoric fish
- List of prehistoric bony fish
