= Turtle Island Restoration Network =

American nonprofit organization

Turtle Island Restoration Network (TIRN) is a United States 501(c)(3) non-profit organization founded in 1999 whose mission is "To take swift and decisive action to protect and restore marine species and their habitats and to inspire people in communities all over the world to join us as active and vocal marine species advocates."

== Overview ==
TIRN provides the umbrella organization to a number of projects including the Sea Turtle Restoration Project (STRP), Got Mercury? and SPAWN (Salmon Protection and Watershed Network). In order to achieve its goals, TIRN uses a combination of grassroots education and organizing, legal pressure, hands-on conservation, innovative use of the media, research and policy advocacy. TIRN has offices in the United States, Costa Rica and Papua New Guinea and is currently supported by over 10,000 members.

TIRN states its vision as:

"Foreseeing a time when a critical-mass of people in communities all over the world share a common understanding of the intrinsic value of biodiversity and a permanent commitment to acting as wise, willing and able stewards of life in the earth's oceanns and o its lands."

== History ==
TIRN was founded in 1999 to provide an umbrella organization for the Sea Turtle Restoration Project. This had at the time been an affiliate organization of the Earth Island Institute since 1989, focusing on the international protection of endangered sea turtles. In 1999, the project broke off from its parent group and re-incorporated as the Turtle Island Restoration Network.

Since its founding in 1999, TIRN has diversified and expanded its programs. The project, based in Olema, Marin County, California, now includes offices in the Gulf of Mexico, Central America and the Western Pacific. In addition, Got Mercury?, a program to educate the public about mercury levels in seafood, was developed in 2002 under TIRN and the Sea Turtle Restoration Project.

In 1999, the Salmon Protection and Watershed Network, a volunteer-driven program focused on protecting endangered salmon in the Lagunitas Creek watershed, became an official program of TIRN.

Turtle Island Restoration Network was a top finalist for Best Non-Profit Organization in Galveston.com's 2019 Best of the Island Awards.

== Programs ==
TIRN is the umbrella organization for two major programs:

=== Sea Turtle Restoration Project ===
The Sea Turtle Restoration Project was founded in 1989 with the mission to protect endangered sea turtles in ways that make cultural and economic sense to communities that share their habitats with the creatures. The project has a number of active projects including the Save the Leatherback program, the Gulf of Mexico program, US Pacific Sea Turtles, Central America program, Western Pacific program and Got Mercury? program.

=== SPAWN (Salmon Protection and Watershed Network) ===
SPAWN (Salmon Protection and Watershed Network) had its seeds in 1996 and in 1999 became an official program under the umbrella of TIRN. It is a volunteer-driven program that works to protect endangered salmon in the Lagunitas Creek watershed, and the environment. The programmes projects include habitat restoration, fish rescue, citizen training, creek monitoring, creek walks, land acquisition and water conservation.

== Accomplishments ==
Key accomplishments of TIRN include:

2006 TIRN opened its Western Pacific office for the Sea Turtle Restoration Project
2002 TIRN developed its Got Mercury? program under the Sea Turtle Restoration Project
2002 TIRN merged its Sea Turtle Restoration Project with the Texas-based HEART organization to open its Gulf of Mexico office
1999 The Salmon Protection and Watershed Network became an official program of TIRN
1999 TIRN was incorporated and became the umbrella organization for the Sea Turtle Restoration Project that includes offices in California and Central America
