= Diagnosis Mercury =

2008 book by Jane Hightower

Diagnosis Mercury: Money, Politics and Poison
- Author: Jane Hightower
- Genre: Non-fiction
- Publication date: 2008
- ISBN: 978-1-59726-450-1
- OCLC: 318428214

Diagnosis Mercury: Money, Politics and Poison is a 2008 book by Jane Hightower. The book explains that mercury is a poison and that the majority of mercury in the environment comes from coal-fired power plants. But the book is mainly concerned with human exposure from the eating of large predatory fish such as swordfish, shark, king mackerel, large tuna, etc. The book also discusses industrial mercury poisonings, such as those in Minamata, Japan, in the 1950s and Ontario, Canada, in the 1970s.

== See also ==
- Mercury in fish
- Minamata Convention on Mercury
