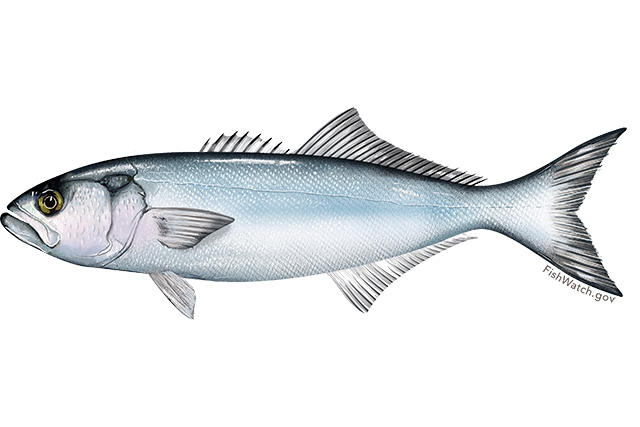

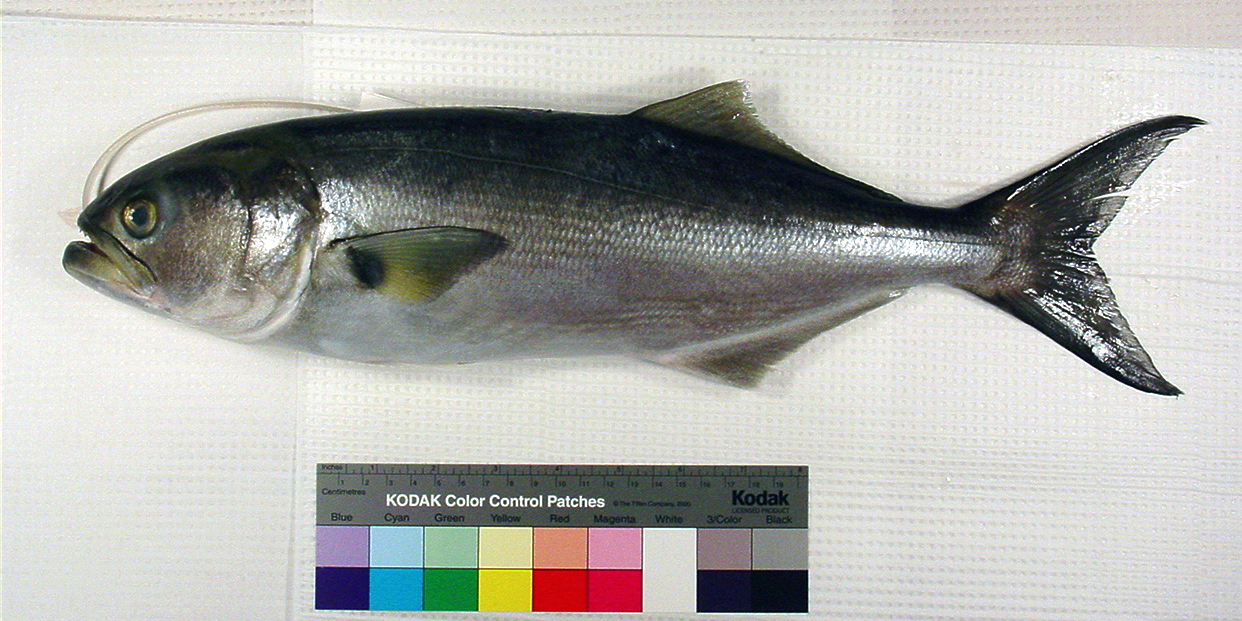

Conservation status
- Vulnerable (IUCN 3.1)

Scientific classification
- Kingdom: Animalia
- Phylum: Chordata
- Class: Actinopterygii
- Division: Teleostei
- Order: Scombriformes
- Family: Pomatomidae; Gill, 1863
- Genus: Pomatomus; Lacépède, 1802
- Species: P. saltatrix

Binomial name
- Pomatomus saltatrix (Linnaeus, 1766)

Synonyms
- List: Gasterosteus saltatrix Linnaeus, 1766; Cheilodipterus saltatrix (Linnaeus, 1766); Perca lophar Forsskål, 1775; Cheilodipterus heptacanthus Lacépède, 1801; Pomatomus skib Lacepède, 1802; Gonenion serra Rafinesque, 1810; Lopharis mediterraneus Rafinesque, 1810; Scomber sypterus Pallas, 1814; Sypterus pallasii Eichwald, 1831; Chromis epicurorum Gronow, 1854; Temnodon conidens Castelnau, 1861; Sparactodon nalnal Rochebrune, 1880; Temnodon tubulus Saville-Kent, 1893; Pomatomus pedica Whitley, 1931

= Bluefish =

Species of marine pelagic fish (Pomatomus saltatrix)

The bluefish (Pomatomus saltatrix) is the only extant species of the family Pomatomidae. It is a marine pelagic fish found around the world in temperate and subtropical waters, except for the northern Pacific Ocean. Bluefish are known as tailor in Australia and New Zealand, elf and shad in South Africa. It is a popular gamefish and food fish.

The bluefish is a moderately proportioned fish, with a broad, forked tail. The spiny first dorsal fin is normally folded back in a groove, as are its pectoral fins. Coloration is a grayish blue-green dorsally, fading to white on the lower sides and belly. Its single row of teeth in each jaw is uniform in size, knife-edged, and sharp. Bluefish commonly range in size from "snappers" of 7 in (18 cm) to much larger, sometimes weighing as much as 30 lb (14 kg), though fish heavier than 20 lb (9 kg) are exceptional.

== Taxonomy ==
The bluefish is the only extant species now included in the family Pomatomidae. At one time, gnomefishes were included, but these are now grouped in a separate family, Scombropidae. Extinct relatives of the bluefish include Carangopsis from the Early Eocene of Italy and Lophar from the Late Miocene of Southern California.

== Distribution ==
Bluefish are widely distributed around the world in tropical and subtropical waters. They are found in pelagic waters on much of the continental shelves along eastern America (though not between south Florida and northern South America), Africa, the Mediterranean and Black Seas (and during migration in between), Southeast Asia, and Australia. They are found in a variety of coastal habitats: above the continental shelf, in energetic waters near surf beaches, or by rock headlands. They also enter estuaries and inhabit brackish waters. Periodically, they leave the coasts and migrate in schools through open waters.

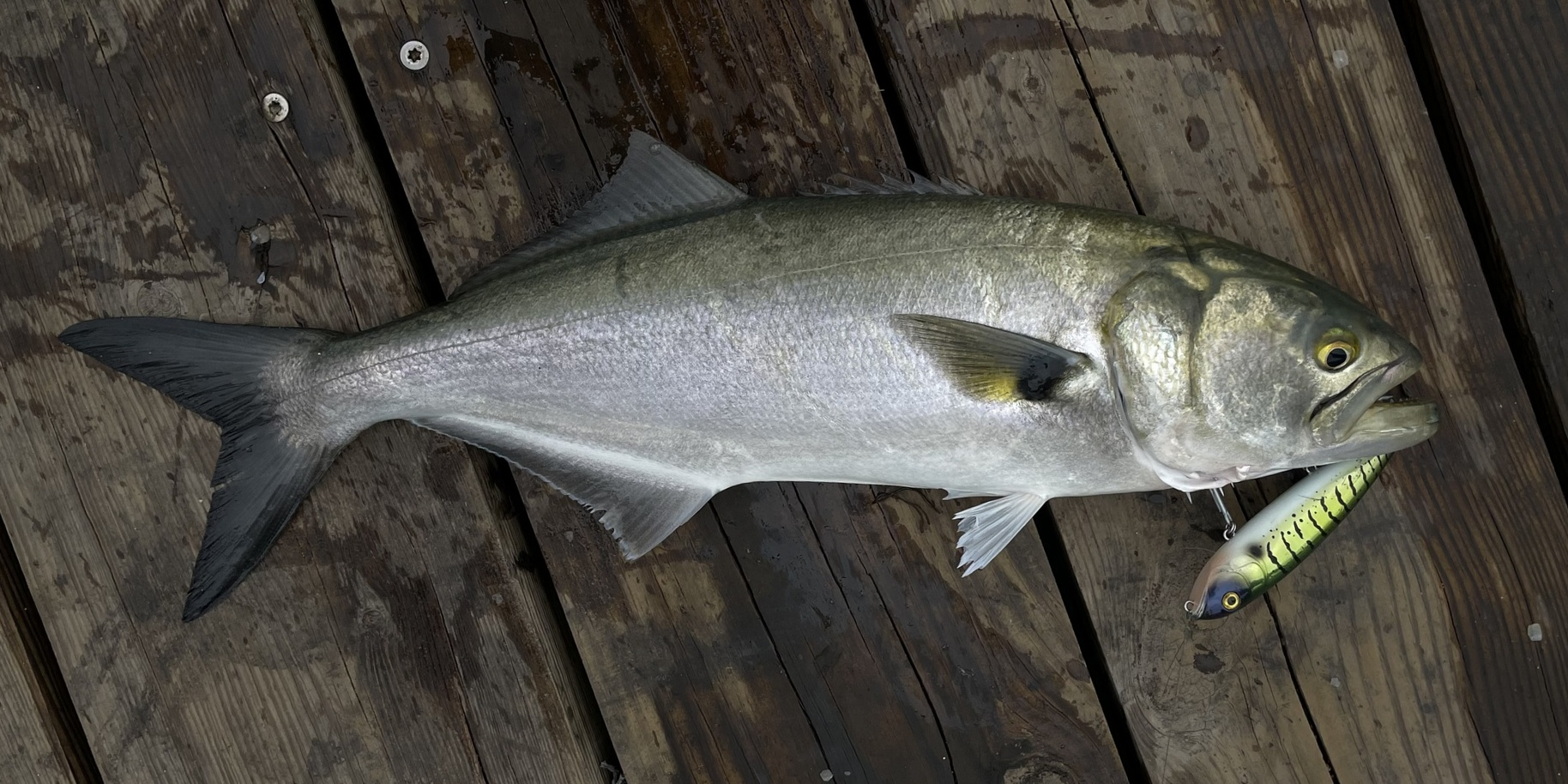
In Connecticut

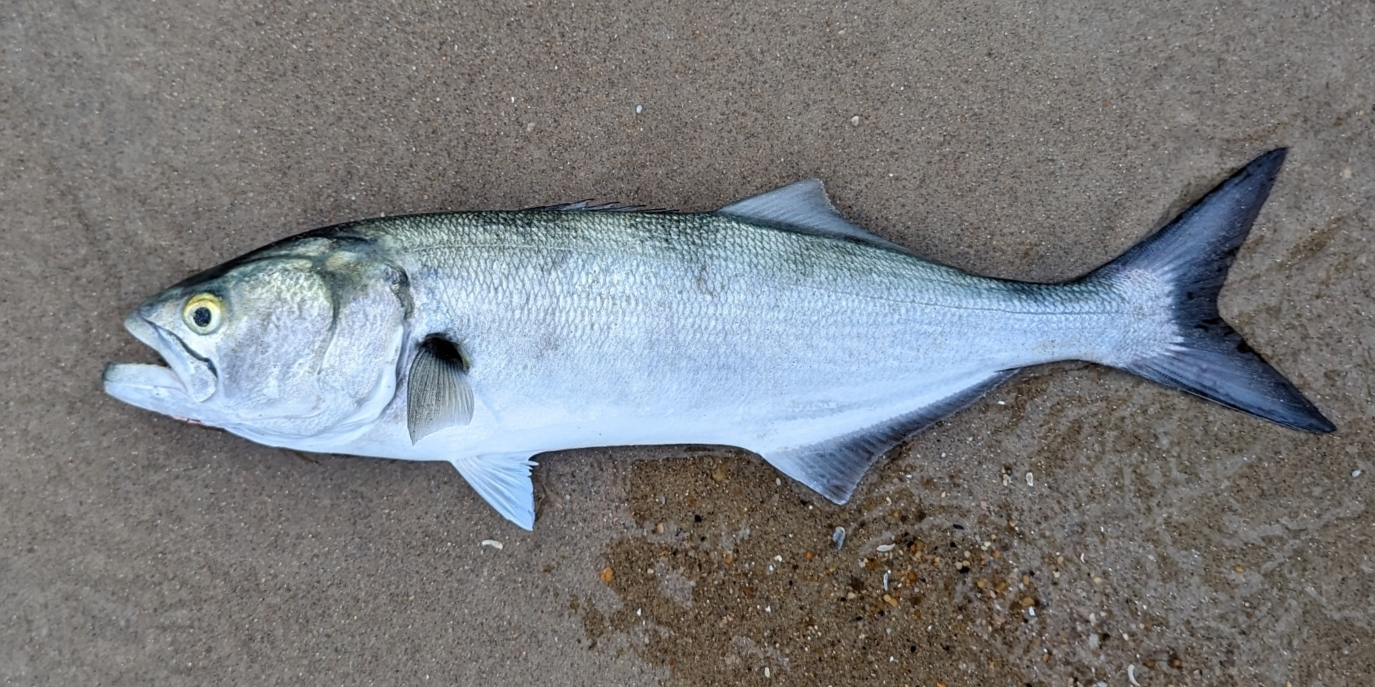
In North Carolina

Along the U.S. East Coast, bluefish are found off Florida in the winter. By April, they have disappeared, heading north. By June, they may be found off Massachusetts; in years of high abundance, stragglers may be found as far north as Nova Scotia. By October, they leave the waters north of Cape Cod, heading south down the East Coast of the United States from Rhode Island south to Georgia, to the waters off Florida. Some bluefish, perhaps less migratory, are present in the Gulf of Mexico throughout the year.

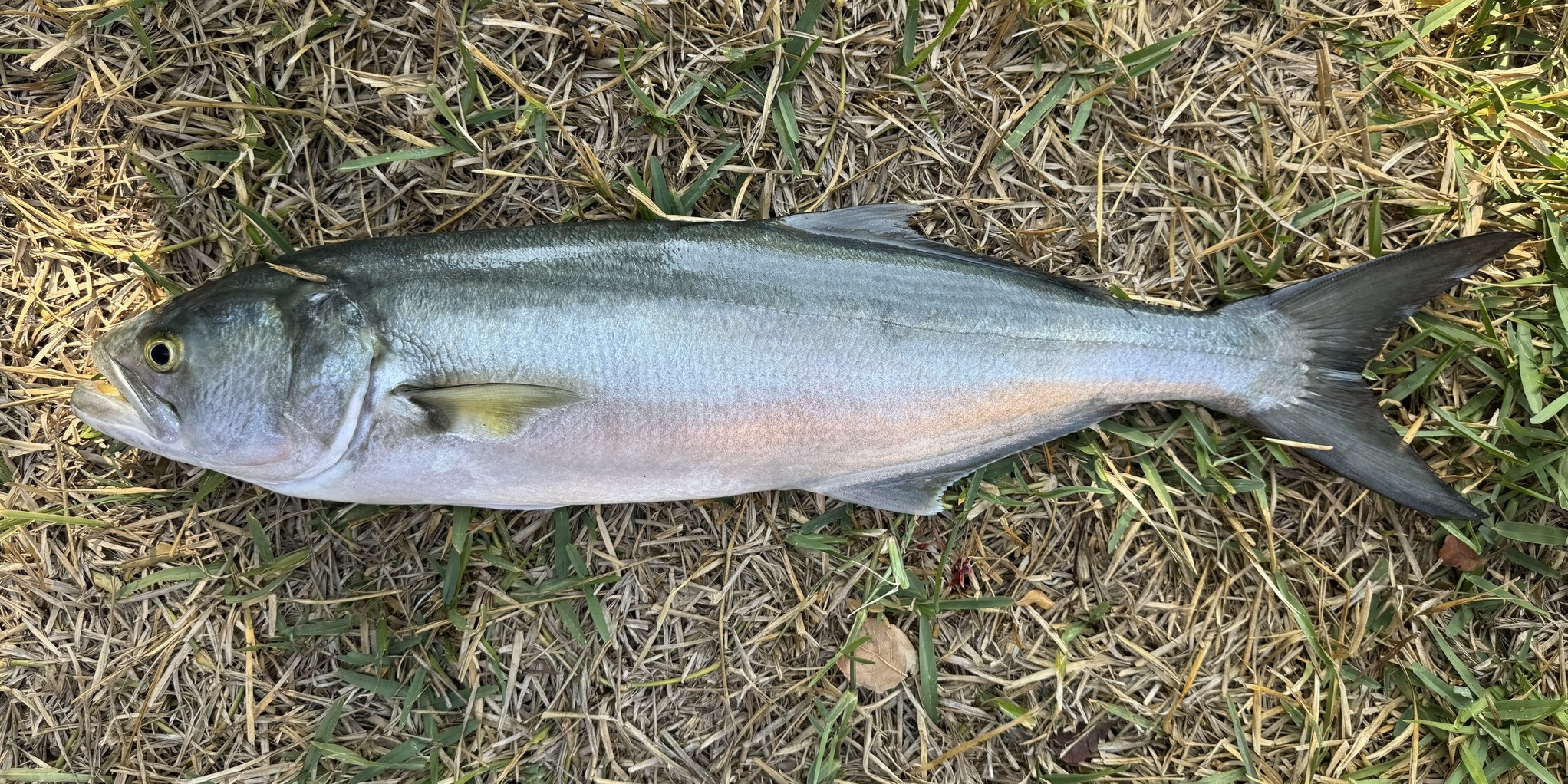
In Turkey

In a similar pattern overall, the economically significant population that spawns in Europe's Black Sea migrates south through Istanbul (Bosphorus, Sea of Marmara, Dardanelles, Aegean Sea) and on toward Turkey's Mediterranean coast in the autumn for the cold season. A campaign was launched in Turkey by Fikir Sahibi Damaklar (Intelligent Palates) to protect the Bluefish in 2013. More recently, it was reported that bluefish near Istanbul were abundant and that there is a fishing ban every year between April 15 and Sept. 1 to preserve fish eggs and ensure sustainable fish farming. Along the South African coast and environs, movement patterns are roughly in parallel.

== Life history ==
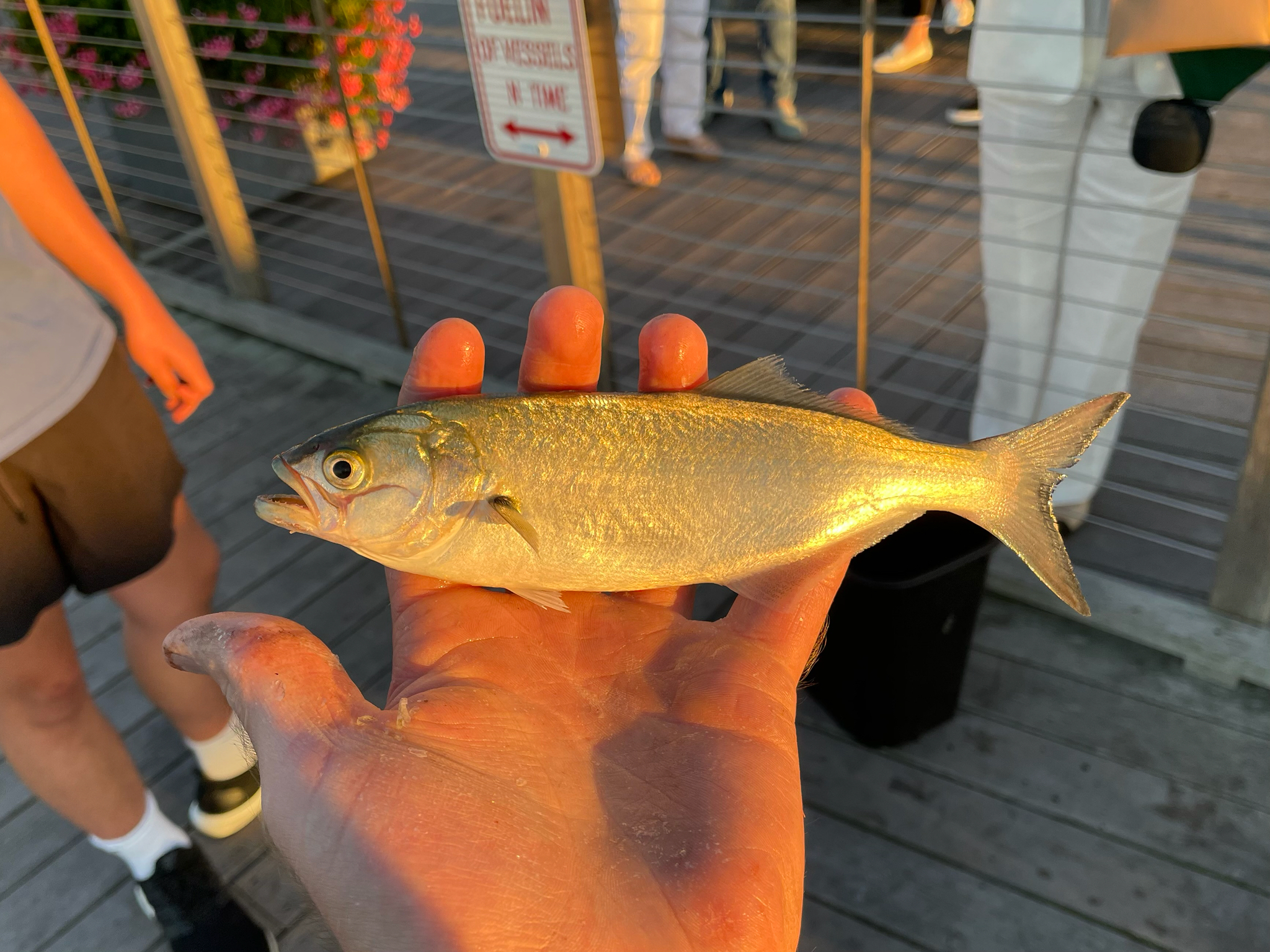
Juvenile

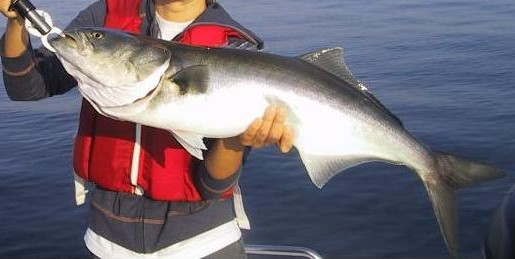
Large adult

Adult bluefish are typically 30–60 cm (12–24 in) long, with a maximum reported size of 130 cm (51 in) and 14 kg (31 lb). They reproduce during spring and summer, and can live up to 9 years. Bluefish fry eat zooplankton, and are largely at the mercy of currents. Spent bluefish have been found off east-central Florida, migrating north. As with most marine fish, their spawning habits are not well known. In the western side of the North Atlantic, at least two populations occur, separated by Cape Hatteras in North Carolina. The Gulf Stream can carry fry spawned to the south of Cape Hatteras to the north, and eddies can spin off, carrying them into populations found off the coast of the mid-Atlantic, and the New England states.

== Feeding habits ==
External videos
- Bluefish blitz – YouTube
- Bluefish Feeding Frenzy – YouTube

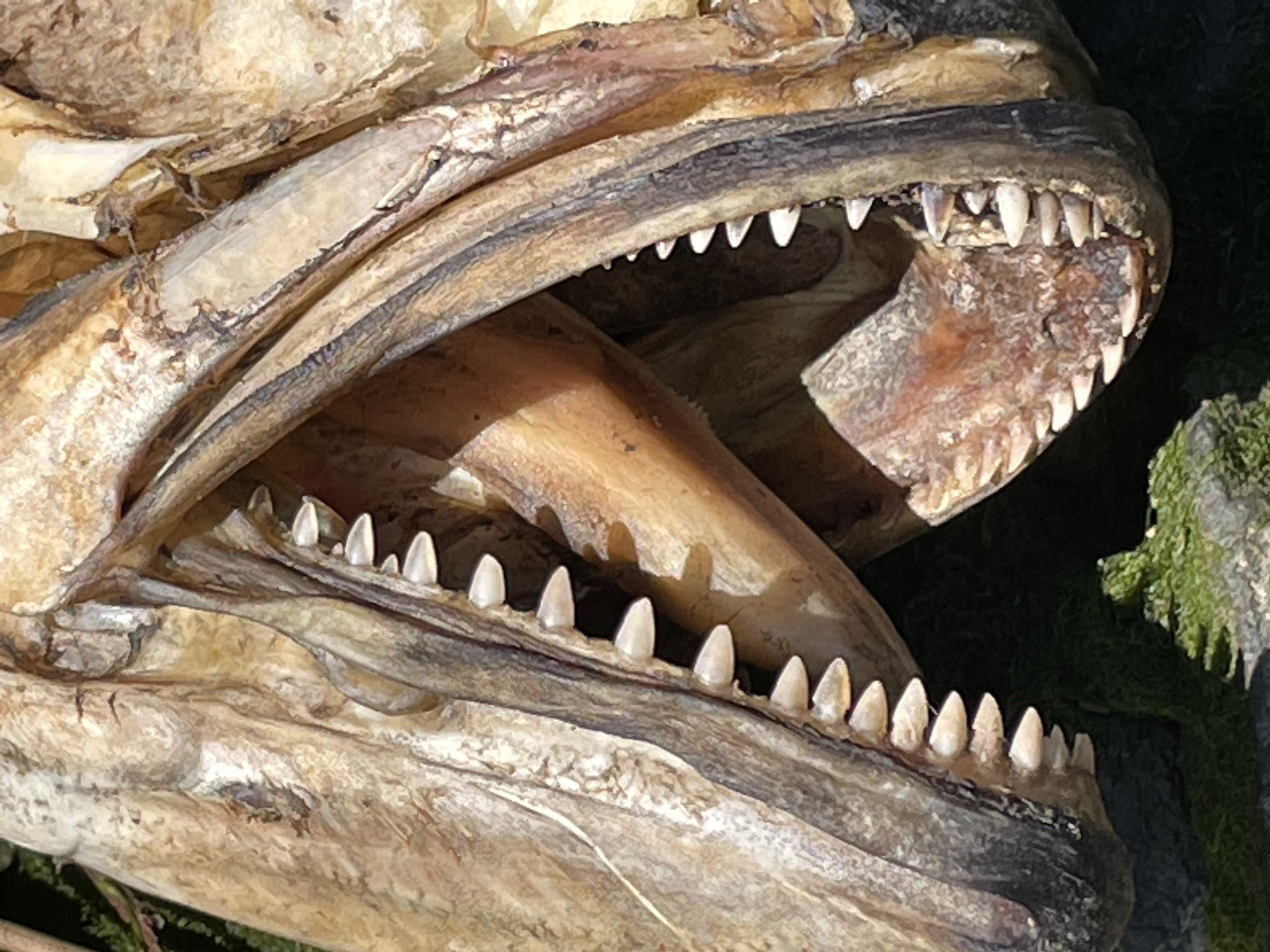
Bluefish dentition

Adult bluefish are strong and aggressive, and live in loose groups. They are fast swimmers that prey on schools of forage fish, and continue attacking them in feeding frenzies even after they appear to have eaten their fill. Depending on area and season, they favor menhaden and other sardine-like fish (Clupeidae), jacks (Scombridae), weakfish (Sciaenidae), grunts (Haemulidae), striped anchovies (Engraulidae), shrimp, and squid. They are cannibalistic and can destroy their own young. Bluefish sometimes chase bait through the surf zone, attacking schools in very shallow water, churning the water like a washing machine. This behavior is sometimes referred to as a "bluefish blitz".

In turn, bluefish are preyed upon by larger predators at all stages of their lifecycle. As juveniles, they fall victim to a wide variety of oceanic predators, including striped bass, larger bluefish, fluke (summer flounder), weakfish, tuna, sharks, rays, and dolphins. As adults, bluefish are taken by tuna, sharks, billfish, seals, sea lions, dolphins, porpoises, and many other species.

Bluefish are aggressive and have been known to inflict severe bites on fishermen. Wading or swimming among feeding bluefish schools can be dangerous. In July 2006, a seven-year-old girl was attacked on a beach, near the Spanish town of Alicante, allegedly by a bluefish.

== Parasites ==
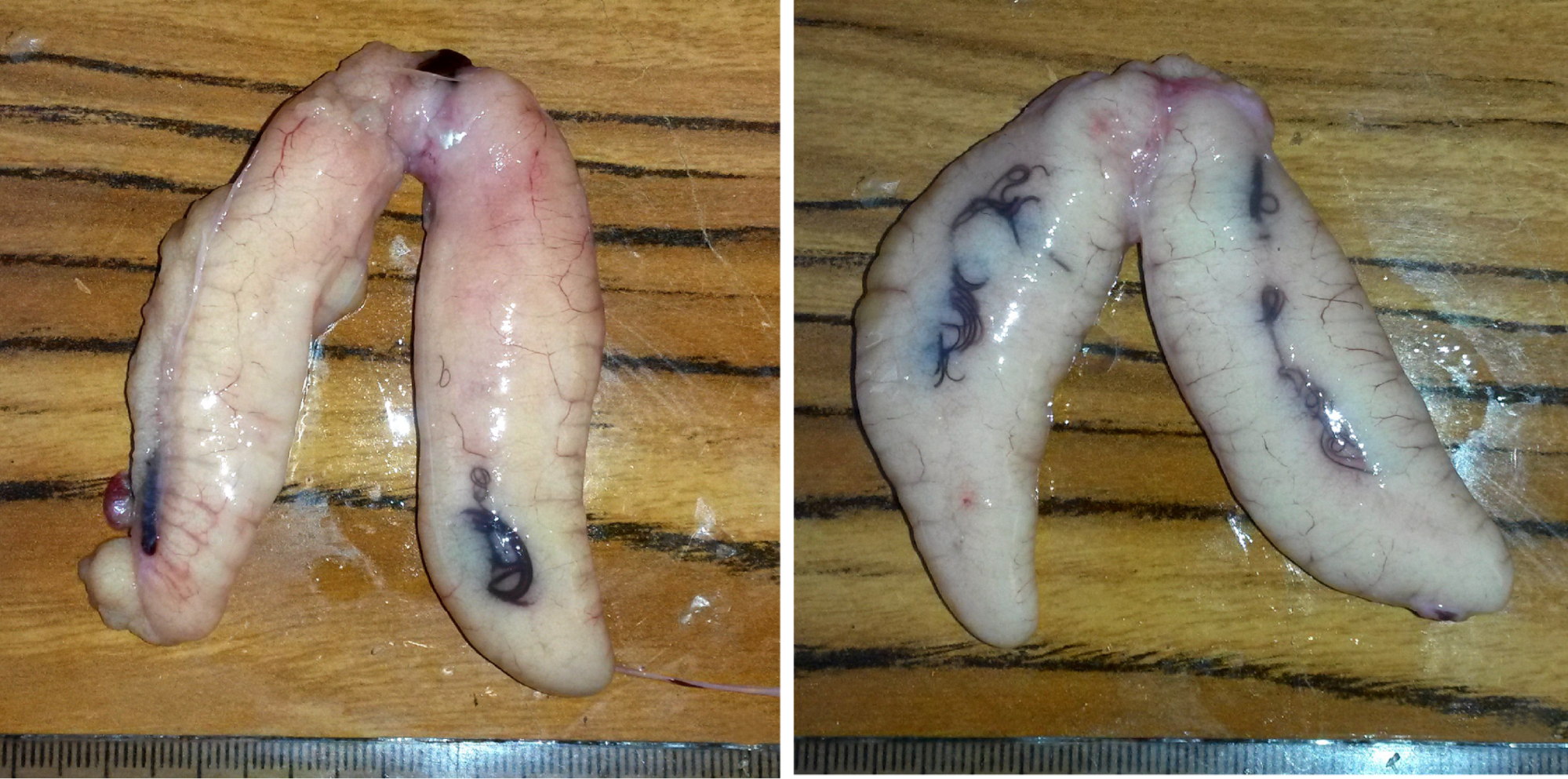
Bluefish ovaries with visible Philometra (nematode parasites) females

Like other fish, bluefish host a number of parasites. One parasite is Philometra saltatrix, a philometrid nematode in the ovaries. The females are brownish red and may be as long as 80 mm; the males are very small.

== Recreational fisheries ==
In Australia, bluefish, called "tailor", are caught on the east coast from Fraser Island in Queensland around the Australian coastline to Point Quobba in Western Australia, including Tasmania. Lower numbers are generally found around southern Australia. Tailor are pelagic, forming schools near the surface, and move inshore to feed in bays, estuaries, and surf zones at depths up to 15 m. The juveniles inhabit large bays and estuaries, while adults prefer the rocky headlands and beaches. Globally, the species occurs in tropical and temperate waters of the Atlantic, Pacific, and Indian Oceans, but is absent from the Eastern and Northwestern Pacific.

The IGFA All Tackle World Record for bluefish stands at 14.4 kg (31 lb 12 oz) landed by James Hussey near Hatteras, North Carolina.

== Commercial fisheries ==
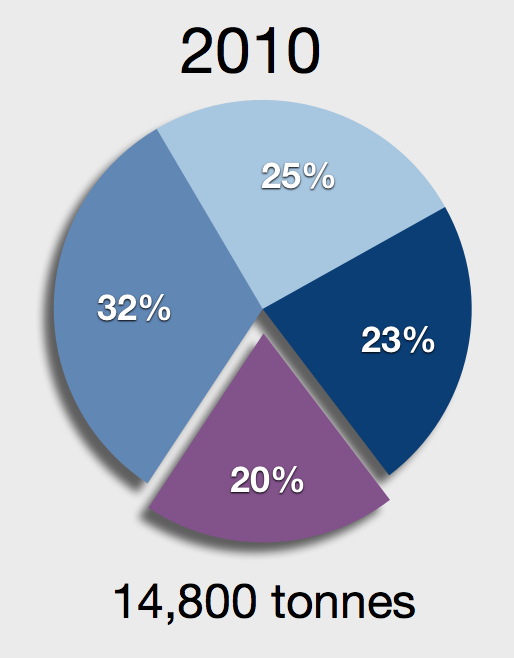
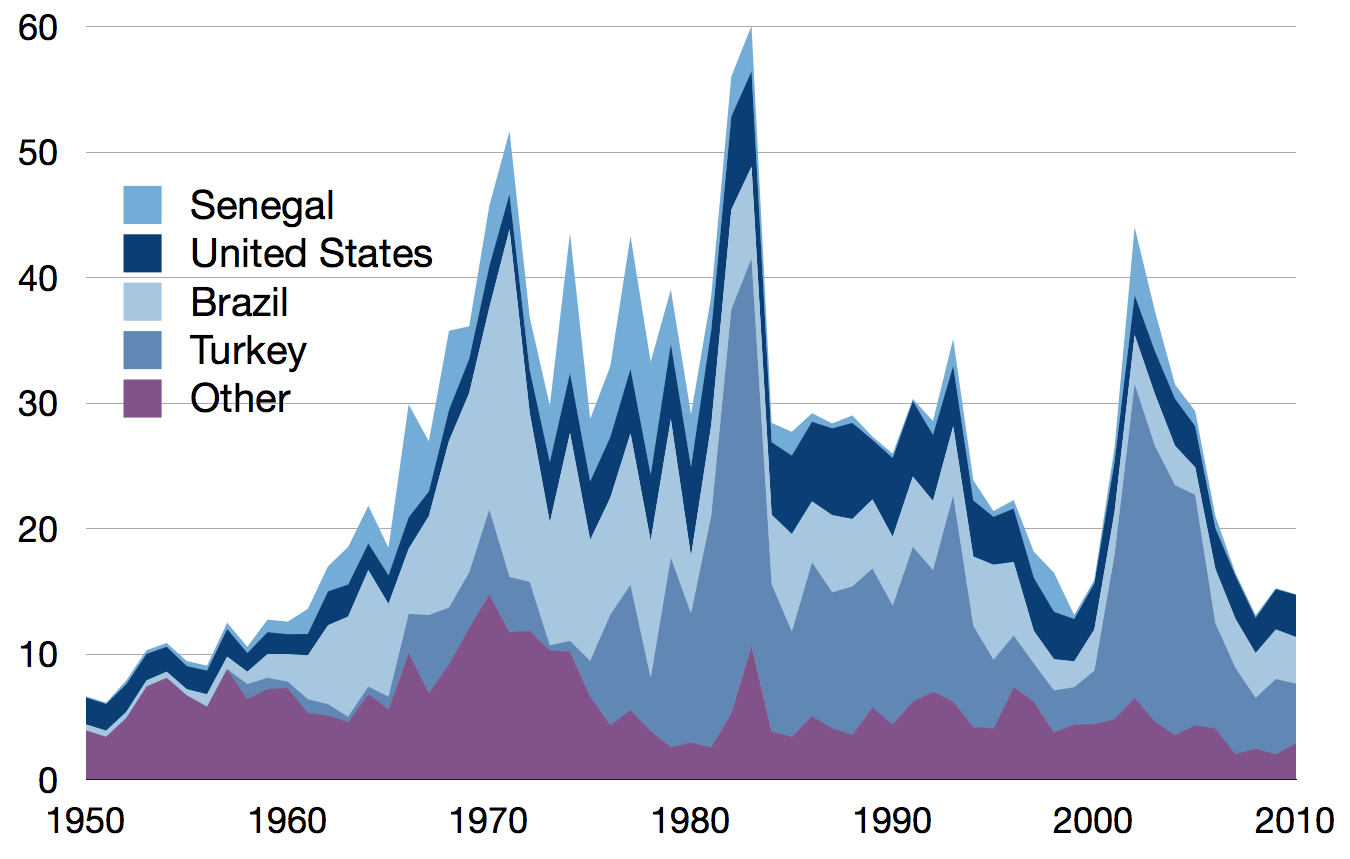
Wild capture of bluefish by countries in thousand tonnes, 1950–2010, as reported by the FAO

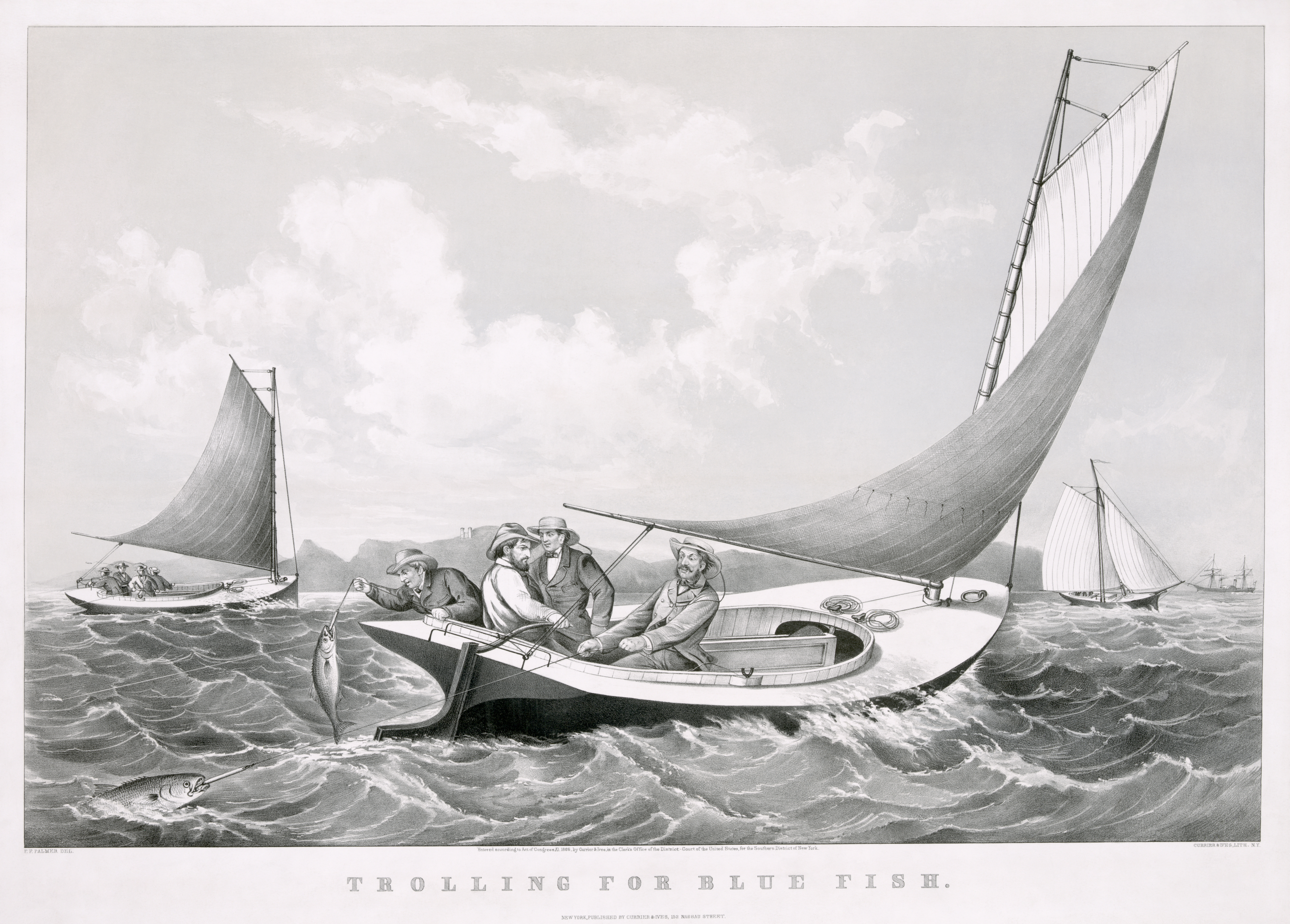
Trolling for blue fish lithograph by Currier & Ives, 1866

In the U.S., bluefish are landed primarily in recreational fisheries, but important commercial fisheries also exist in temperate and subtropical waters. Bluefish population abundance is typically cyclical, with abundance varying widely over a span of 10 years or more.

== Management ==
Bluefish is a popular sport and food fish, and has been widely overfished. Fisheries management has generally stabilized its population. In the middle Atlantic region of the U.S., bluefish were heavily overfished in the late 1990s, but active management rebuilt the stock by 2007. Elsewhere, public awareness efforts, such as bluefish festivals, combined with catch limits, may be having positive effects in reducing the stress on the regional stocks.

== Culinary use ==
Bluefish may be baked or smoked. The smaller ones ("snapper blues") are generally fried, as they are not very oily.

Because of its fattiness, bluefish goes rancid rapidly, so it is generally not found far from its fisheries, but where it is available, it is often inexpensive. It must be refrigerated and consumed soon after purchase; some recipes call for keeping it in vinegar and wine before cooking, in vina d'alhos or en escabeche.

=== Nutrition ===
Their meat is high in omega-3 fatty acids, but also in mercury and PCBs, containing the high level of about 0.4 ppm of mercury on average, comparable to albacore tuna or Spanish mackerel. For that reason, the U.S. FDA recommends that young children and women of childbearing age consume no more than one serving per week (a serving size is about 4 ounces [110 g] uncooked for an adult, 2 oz [55 g] for children ages 4–7 years, 3 oz [85 g] for children ages 8–10 years, and 4 ounces for children 11 years and older).
