= Fikir Sahibi Damaklar =

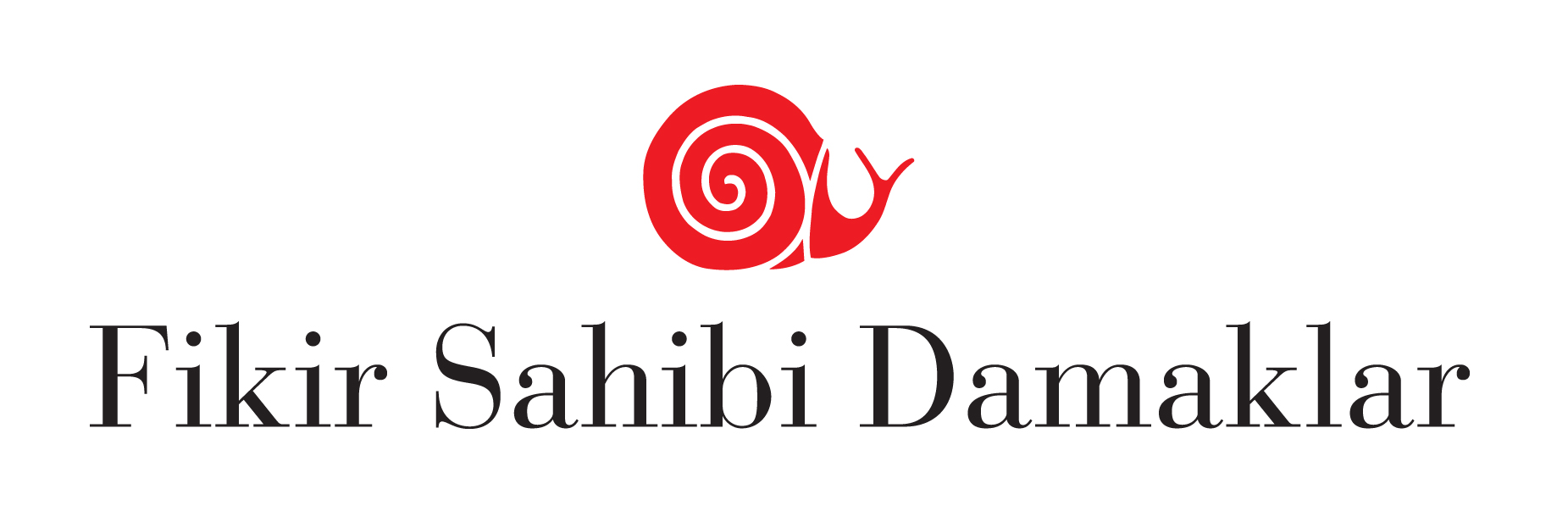
Current logo.

Fikir Sahibi Damaklar convivium located in Istanbul, Turkey is one of the local branches of Slow Food—an international nonprofit member-supported association founded to counter the rise of fast food, the disappearance of local food traditions and people's dwindling interest in the food they eat, where it comes from and how our food choices affect the rest of the world. Fikir Sahibi Damaklar is an urban group, aiming to transform consumers into co-producers.

The Turkish Wikipedia page for the association (https://tr.wikipedia.org/wiki/Fikir_Sahibi_Damaklar) describes and provides sources for several campaigns run by the association (whose name translates as Intelligent Palates). These include a campaign against the extinction of bluefish, one of the fish of Istanbul.
