= Got Mercury? =

Public awareness campaign towards mercury levels in seafood

Got Mercury? is a public awareness campaign about mercury levels in seafood. It is sponsored by the Sea Turtle Restoration Project (STRP) and its parent organization, the Turtle Island Restoration Network (TIRN). The name of the campaign is based on the successful Got Milk? advertising campaign.

== History ==
Although the STRP was founded to protect sea turtles in their natural habitats, the organization began the Got Mercury? campaign in 2002. The campaign advocates that supermarkets and restaurants post warning signs about mercury contamination in seafood, require them to regularly screen seafood for levels of mercury under one part per million and that species that contain the "highest levels of mercury" should be removed from the shelves. In 2004, the organization created an online mercury seafood calculator, one that was mimicked by the free market Center for Consumer Freedom not long thereafter.

On March 17, 2008, Got Mercury? issued a report entitled, Mercury in Seafood: No Fair Warning, which included these findings:

- Mercury levels of swordfish and tuna tested from California markets often exceeded the FDA limit of 1 ppm.
- Several California restaurant chains were chronically out of compliance with California Proposition 65 which requires restaurants serving mercury-contaminated seafood to post consumer advisory warnings.
- About 70% of California supermarkets did not have adequate signage to warn consumers about mercury-contaminated seafood.

Shortly after the release of the report, the National Fisheries Institute issued a press advisory urging reporters to disregard the report on the basis that it might cause public harm by leading individuals, including mothers and children, to consume less fish and lose the benefits from omega-3 fatty acids that can be important to early childhood development.

In January 2011, the group secretly tested samples of seafood bought from California retailers. The group tested swordfish, tuna, halibut, and salmon for traces of methylmercury. The results of the study showed that tuna and swordfish purchased from some supermarkets and sushi restaurants contained as much as three times the FDA limit for mercury contamination. Representatives of the seafood industry criticized the report, arguing that it might lead consumers to eat less seafood and thus be detrimental to public health. Pamela Tom, manager of the seafood extension program at the University of California at San Diego also noted that no cases of methylmercury poisoning have been found from fish documented with the Centers for Disease Control and Prevention.

== Funding ==
Currently, the Turtle Island Restoration Network provides organizational support for the STRP, Got Mercury?, as well as the SPAWN. Between 1999 and 2008, the Turtle Island Restoration Network has received $93,000 from the Foundation for Deep Ecology, an organization founded by fashion executive Douglas Tompkins.

== See also ==
- Mercury in fish
- Mercury poisoning, a disease caused by exposure to the element mercury or its toxic compounds
- Mercury vacuum, a vacuum cleaner specifically designed to collect spills and vapors of the element mercury
- Mercury-containing and Rechargeable Battery Management Act, a 1996 United States law to phase out the use of mercury in batteries
- Minamata disease, industrial mercury pollution
- Niigata Minamata disease, industrial mercury pollution
