= Sea Turtle Restoration Project =

The Sea Turtle Restoration Project (STRP), founded in 1989, is a project of Turtle Island Restoration Network (TIRN), a United States 501(c)(3) nonprofit environmental organization with a goal of protecting endangered sea turtles from human-caused threats at nesting beaches and in the ocean.

STRP states its mission as being:

To protect endangered sea turtles in ways that make cultural and economic sense to the communities that share the beaches and waters with these gentle creatures.

STRP engages in activities such as educating the public about sea turtles, urging people to get involved with sea turtle protection, advocating for laws and regulations that protect sea turtles from accidentally getting caught in commercial fishing operations, filing lawsuits when the United States Endangered Species Act or other conservation laws are violated, and disseminating information about sea turtles to elected officials, regulatory agencies, members of the media and the public. STRP currently has offices in the United States, Central America and the Western Pacific.

== History ==
Todd Steiner, a herpetologist and then director of the Save the Dolphin Project, an affiliate organization of the Earth Island Institute, launched STRP to help strengthen sea turtle protection policies at the local and international level. Steiner had traveled to Nicaragua to assist local communities in protecting their nesting populations of sea turtles. When he returned to the United States Steiner learned that the sea turtles that were protected in Nicaragua were being killed in Mexico to supply shells for the Japanese luxury apparel market. The sea turtle is a highly migratory species that crosses national boundaries as part of its natural life cycle.

STRP join international efforts to end the trade in endangered sea turtles by organizing protests at the Mexican and Japanese consulates in the United States and generating thousands of letters and phone calls of protest. Mexico banned the killing of sea turtles and Japan ended its illegal trade in endangered sea turtle parts for luxury items.

Since 1989, STRP has attempted to address other threats facing sea turtles at nesting beaches and in the ocean where sea turtles spend most of their time. This has included protecting critical nesting habitat in Central America, seeking to establish a marine reserve for the Kemp's ridley sea turtle in [/Texas/], developing community-based projects to protect local sea turtle populations in the Western Pacific, preventing the capture of sea turtles by industrial fishing operations worldwide, and protecting critical foraging habitat for the near extinct Pacific leatherback turtle off the west coast of the United States.

In 1999 STRP broke off from its parent organization Earth Island Institute and was re-incorporated as the Turtle Island Restoration Network (TIRN). That same year STRP staff members marched with people dressed in sea turtle costumes at the World Trade Organization (WTO) meetings in Seattle to protest the conflict of trade rules with protecting endangered species. In September 2008 the movie titled Battle in Seattle was released that dramatizes the events surrounding the 1999 WTO protests.

== Programs ==
STRP currently has five programs that focus on protecting sea turtles and the marine environment. These include the Save the Leatherback program, Gulf of Mexico program, US Pacific sea turtle campaign, Central America program and Western Pacific program. In addition STRP has a public health campaign - Got Mercury? - that addresses the public health issue of mercury in seafood.

=== Save the Leatherback Program ===
STRP began the Save the Leatherback Program in 2000 when a scientific article published in Nature magazine stated that the Pacific leatherback sea turtle could become extinct within 10–30 years if its adult mortality was not drastically reduced. Industrialized fishing practices, particularly longlining and drift gillnetting, used to catch swordfish, shark, and tuna, were cited as causing the most adult leatherback mortality. In response, STRP convened the International Leatherback Survival Conference in April 2002. The outcome was a call by leading sea turtle and marine scientists for a moratorium on Pacific longlining and drift gillnetting. In the next few years STRP organized over 1,000 scientists from 97 countries and 280 NGOs to sign a petition to the United Nations seeking a moratorium on high seas industrial longline fishing to prevent the extinction of the Pacific leatherback sea turtle. In 2004 the documentary Last Journey for the Leatherback? was released, which depicts the plight of the Pacific leatherback sea turtle.

=== US Pacific sea turtle program ===
STRP's American Pacific sea turtle campaign began in 2001 when their legal action forced a seasonal closure of the California/Oregon drift gillnet fishery to protect endangered sea turtles and other marine species. In 2006 STRP and a coalition of environmental organizations prevented efforts by the Pacific Fisheries Management Council (PFMC) to reopen the seasonal closure to drift gillnet fishing. STRP is currently working to prevent the development of a pelagic longline fishery within the California Exclusive Economic Zone (EEZ) where it has been banned for 30 years to protect various marine species.

=== Gulf of Mexico program ===
In August 2002 STRP merged with the Texas-based Help Endangered Animals – Ridley Turtles (HEART) organization and opened its Gulf of Mexico office. The focus of this program is protecting the habitat of the critically endangered Kemp's ridley sea turtle through the enforcement of turtle excluder devices (TEDs) in shrimp nets and the development of a Kemp's ridley marine reserve that is off limits to commercial fishing in the Gulf of Mexico. In 2008 a record-breaking season occurred with 148 Kemp's ridley nests found along the Texas coast, which was more than double the figure found in 2005.

=== Central America program ===
Since 1989, STRP has been working directly in Central America with coastal communities in an effort to protect sea turtles. Along with its sister organization PRETOMA, which is based in Costa Rica, STRP is focused on decreasing the threats to sea turtles in Central America that include development of nesting sites, killing of breeding females, illegal poaching of eggs, and the incidental capture of sea turtles by industrial fishing fleets.

=== Western Pacific program ===
STRP's Western Pacific program began in 2006 and is based on the island of Papua New Guinea. STRP partners with coastal communities to protect and restore the declining leatherback turtle population and habitat by helping to establish conservation deeds in important nesting beaches and marine waters.

=== Got Mercury? ===
In 2002 STRP began its Got Mercury? program to educate the public about mercury levels in seafood and to take action to reduce the public's exposure to methylmercury in seafood. Got Mercury? has tested mercury levels in fish found in sushi restaurants and found high levels of mercury in tuna. Volunteers monitor restaurants and supermarkets to make sure they are in compliance with California's Proposition 65 law. Proposition 65 requires the posting of mercury in seafood consumer advisory warnings by seafood purveyors. Got Mercury? developed a free online mercury in seafood calculator that allows individuals to use the Environmental Protection Agency's calculations to estimate average mercury exposure levels by fish type and amount relative to a person's weight.
