= Safe Harbor Certified Seafood =

- Type: Subsidiary of Micro Analytical Systems, Inc.
- Genre: Seafood
- Headquarters: Emeryville, California, USA
- Website: www.safeharborfoods.com

Safe Harbor Certified Seafood is the first brand developed under San Rafael, California based Micro Analytical Systems, Inc. (MASI). Seafood bearing the Safe Harbor seal is tested for overall mercury content to be under the FDA's action level of 1ppm, histamine, Escherichia coli O157:H7(E.coli O157:H7) and salmonella. Every large fin fish is individually tested by MASI personnel so the maximum mercury level in that fish does not exceed the limit set for that species. In addition, most shellfish and farmed species of catfish, shrimp and tilapia are screened for E.coli O157:H7 and Salmonella while exotic species like tuna, mahi mahi and swordfish are tested for scombroid food poisoning see histamine. Fish that are not individually tested (fish generally known to be lower in mercury, two lbs and under) are batch tested using an ANSI approved sampling algorithm ensuring a 95% confidence rate that the respective lot being tested falls under the Safe Harbor standard set for that species.

== Company ==
In 2002, Micro Analytical Systems, Inc. (MASI) developed technology for testing seafood for its mercury concentration. A decade of research and development led to the development of a proprietary technology that can test any tissue sample for overall mercury concentrations. Tissue samples are extracted using a modified biopsy needle with quantitative results registering in less than 60 seconds. In contrast to other conventional testing procedures, the nature of the technology and the speed of the testing process not only allows the sample to then be consumed, the testing can be done in real-time in processing and distribution facilities, on the production line. According to their data, MASI has conducted over 200,000 tests on seafood to determine its mercury concentration and presence of histamine and harmful pathogens.

In 2010, MASI began testing for E.coli O157 :H7 and Salmonella through the use of Polymerase Chain Reaction (PCR) based technology. In addition, MASI also began testing for histamine, a product of spoilage due to time and temperature abuse usually as a result of improper handling, temperature control and elevated levels of histamine producing bacteria in the marine environment. MASI uses the competitive ELISA (Enzyme-linked immunosorbent assay) method for the screening of histamine in scombroid species of fish.

== Testing locations ==
MASI tests fish under the Safe Harbor Label at facilities around the world located in:

- Las Vegas, NV, USA
- Chicago, IL, USA
- San Francisco, CA, USA
- Emeryville, CA, USA
