= Mercury vacuum =

Vacuum cleaner specifically designed to collect mercury

A mercury vacuum is a vacuum cleaner specifically designed to collect mercury metal, for instance to clean up spills of the element. It is a requirement of the U.S. EPA that a mercury vacuum cleaner be used to clean up mercury spills (if an alternative method is used, a description of the method must be submitted to the EPA Administrator in a Notification of Compliance Status report). Shop Vacs may or may not be suitable. A mercury vacuum cleaner should be designed to prevent generation of airborne mercury typically through the use of an activated carbon charcoal filter in addition to any particulate filters. The ends of hoses should be capped after each use; and after vacuuming, the area should be washed down. Users of mercury vacuum cleaners should be trained in the handling of hazardous materials.

== See also ==
- Mercury poisoning, a disease caused by exposure to the element mercury or its toxic compounds
- Mercury-Containing and Rechargeable Battery Management Act, a 1996 United States law to phase out the use of mercury in batteries
- Poison control
