= Earth Island Institute =

American environmental organization

- Logo used since 2018
- Formation: 1982; 44 years ago Berkeley, California
- Type: International NGO
- Headquarters: Berkeley, California
- Region served: Worldwide
- Website: earthisland.org

The Earth Island Institute is an American non-profit environmental group founded in 1982 by David Brower. Located in Berkeley, California, it supports activism around environmental issues through fiscal sponsorship that provides the administrative and organizational infrastructure for individual projects.

== Earth Island Journal ==
Earth Island Institute publishes a quarterly periodical entitled Earth Island Journal, edited by Maureen Nandini Mitra. Content is largely dedicated to investigative pieces and showcases environmental grassroots movements as well as environmental reporting and commentary from around the world. The publication has received industry awards for "uncovering stories ignored by larger media outlets," including a 2019 Izzy Award for independent media.

== Brower Youth Awards ==
Earth Island has presented the Brower Youth Awards, named for the founder, David Brower, to six young environmental leaders since 2000.

== Dolphin-safe labeling ==
Earth Island Institute is the standard-bearer for dolphin-safe tuna labeling in the United States. The organization works to verify or reject domestic tuna as dolphin-safe.

== Incubator projects ==
Earth Island Institute sponsors a number of fledgling activist groups which it refers to as Incubator Projects. Many have gone on to become independent 501(c)(3) organizations, and others remain under the umbrella of the institute.

- Plastic Pollution Coalition
- Rooted in Community

== Alumni projects ==
As of March 2017, the following organizations were projects of Earth Island Institute before they left to continue their environmental work as independent organizations:

- Bluewater Network (merged with Friends of the Earth)
- Energy Action Coalition
- International Rivers
- Rainforest Action Network
- Sea Turtle Restoration Project

== 2013 Solomon Islands dolphin slaughter ==
In January 2013, Fanalei villagers on the island of Malaita, in the Solomon Islands, slaughtered 700 dolphins after villagers refused to renew a memorandum of understanding with Earth Island Institute that expired in April 2012. Villagers claim EII promised them $2.4 million Solomon Island Dollars (about $335,000 U.S.) to stop trading dolphins and dolphin-derived products for two years but that they received only $700,000.

Chairman Atkin Fakaia of a local villagers' association claimed that villagers had to kill the dolphins to trade the meat and the teeth for money to survive in the local economy. Earth Island Institute Director Lawrence Makili accused the association of mishandling the first $300,000 invested under the original memorandum of understanding. Makili accused the villagers' association of seizing funds and failing to distribute them.

== See also ==
- Summers v. Earth Island Institute
