= Sinking of U-864 =

1945 sinking of a German U-boat by a British submarine

Action of 9 February 1945
- Part of The Battle of the Atlantic during the Second World War
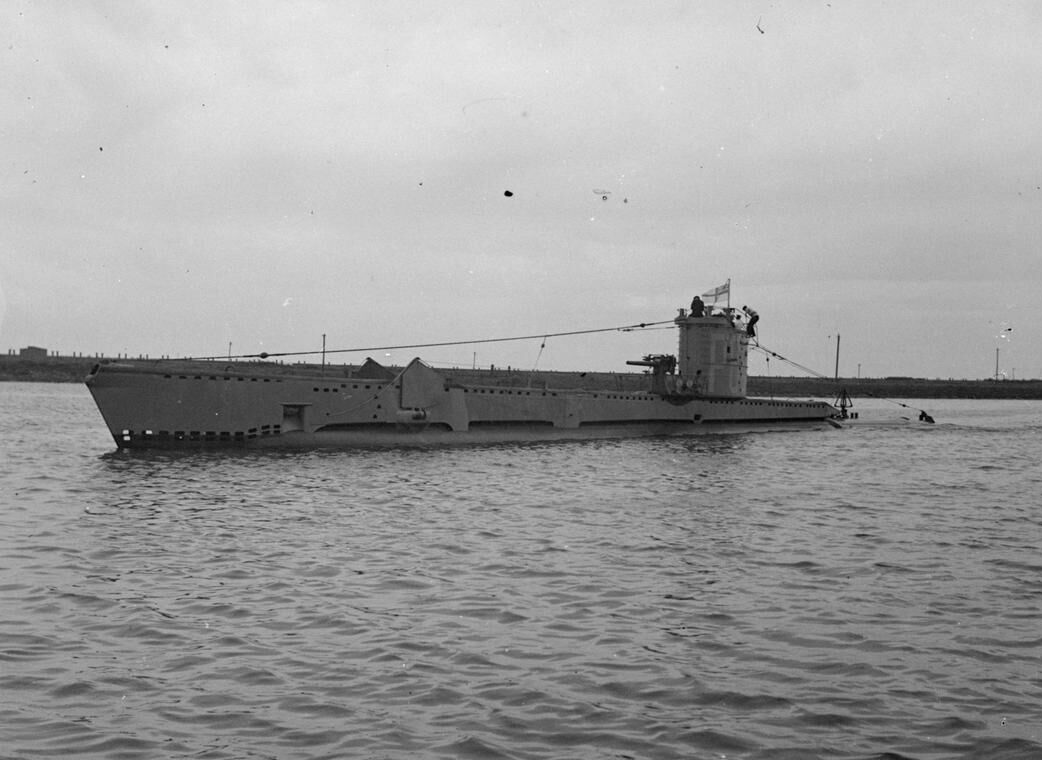
- HMS Venturer in August 1943
| Date | 9 February 1945 |
| Location | Off Fedje Island, Norway 60°46′10″N 4°37′15″E |
| Result | British victory |

Belligerents
| United Kingdom | Germany |

Commanders and leaders
| (United Kingdom) Lieutenant Jimmy Launders | (Nazi Germany) Korvettenkapitän Ralf-Reimar Wolfram † |

Units involved
| HMS Venturer | U-864 |

Casualties and losses
| None | U-864 with all 73 hands |

The German U-boat U-864 was attacked and sunk on 9 February 1945 by HMS Venturer, a V-class submarine of the Royal Navy. Venturer was patrolling the waters around Fedje Island, off the Norwegian coast in the North Sea. The sinking remains the only incident in the history of naval warfare where one submarine sank another while both were submerged.

== Background ==
=== HMS Venturer ===
Shadowgraph of a British V-class submarine

HMS Venturer was a V-class submarine, longer than the earlier U-class with more rake on the stem. The boat was laid down on 25 August 1942 by Vickers Armstrong at Barrow-in-Furness, launched on 4 May 1943 and commissioned on 19 August. The boat had a complement of 37 men, including the captain, Lieutenant Jimmy Launders and had a maximum speed of 13 kn (24 km/h; 15 mph) on the surface. The boat was armed with four 21-inch torpedo tubes with four reloads, a 3-inch gun and three machine-guns.

=== U-864 ===
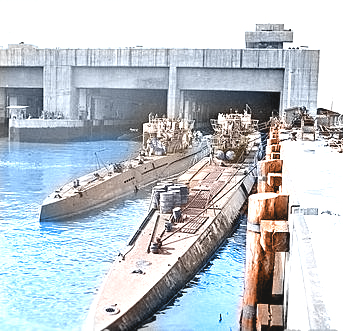
Rear view of a type IX submarine at Trondheim, next to a smaller type VII

U-864 was a Type IX U-boat (Korvettenkapitän Ralf-Reimar Wolfram) on a clandestine mission, Operation Caesar, to the Empire of Japan. On 6 February 1945, U-864 passed through the Fedje area off the Norwegian coast without being detected but an engine kept misfiring. (Note: In 1986, G. P. Jones wrote that sound probably came from "noisy machinery". In 2013, Preisler and Sewell wrote that an air compressor may have been wrongly installed or had worn out, causing the engine to misfire with "loud, fitful vibrations".) There were many Allied (primarily British) ships, submarines and aircraft in the area on anti-submarine patrols. Wolfram decided to return to the pens at Bergen to repair the engine.

== Prelude ==
The British were reading the German Enigma cyphers and the Royal Navy was concerned the secret cargo might enable the Japanese to extend the duration of the Pacific War. When the British got the Enigma decrypts, Venturer, which was in the area, was ordered to destroy U-864. The Admiralty signalled to Venturer,

Important Secret U-boats probably use following routes: from 60°40' North, 004°26' East, Course 110° r/v off Hellisoy 1. Probable that U-boats proceed to seaward off r/v

== Action ==
As Venturer continued her patrol of the waters around Fedje, at 9:32 a.m. the ASDIC operator noticed a faint Hydrophone Effect (HE) which faded, then came back forty minutes later, somewhat louder. After searching for another forty minutes a thin mast was spotted; to avoid giving away its presence, Venturer continued to use HE, which meant that only the estimation of the range of the periscope by the captain and estimation by the ASDIC operator based on the loudness of the HE. (Note: Back-plotting afterwards put the sighting at 5,000 yd (2.5 nmi; 2.8 mi; 4.6 km)) He tracked the U-boat's course by hydrophone and as the hydrophone plot emerged, it was noted that the U-boat was zigzagging. This made the German submarine quite safe according to the assumptions of the time.

Location of the sinking

Launders tracked the U-boat for about three hours but it did not surface; Launders had to decide whether to attack before his batteries lost their charge. It was theoretically possible to compute a firing solution for time, distance, bearing and target depth but this had never been tried because it was assumed that performing the complex calculations would be impossible, plus there were unknown factors that had to be approximated. In most torpedo attacks, the target could be seen; the target's angle relative to the attacker and its bearing would be observed, then a rangefinder in the periscope was used to establish the distance to the target; from this speed could be derived and a basic mechanical computer would offset the aiming point for the torpedo, the depth of which had to be set based on target identification. Too deep and the torpedo would pass under the target, too shallow (in this instance) it would miss above. Launders could only estimate the depth of his target as they tried to manoeuvre into a firing position without giving their position away by creating excessive noise or exhausting their batteries.

Launders made the calculations and assumptions about U-864's defensive manoeuvres, then ordered the firing of all four of his bow torpedo tubes, diving immediately to avoid retaliation by U-864. The torpedoes were fired with a 17.5 second delay between each pair and at different depths. U-864 attempted to evade once it heard the torpedoes coming but lacked manoeuvrability in dives and turns; it took time to retract the snorkel, disengage the diesel and start the electric motors. The first three torpedoes were avoided but U-864 unknowingly steered into the path of the fourth. U-864 exploded, split in two and sank with all hands, coming to rest on the sea floor at a depth of approximately 490 ft (150 m).

== Aftermath ==
U-864 sank 31 nmi (36 mi; 57 km) from the U-boat pens in Bergen. Launders was awarded a bar to his Distinguished Service Order (DSO) and several members of his crew received awards. The action was the only naval engagement ever to have been fought entirely underwater.

== Bibliography ==
- Jones, G. P. (1986). "Chapter XVII: Venturer". Submarines versus U-Boats. London: William Kimber. pp. 187–197. ISBN 978-0-7183-0626-7.
- Preisler, J.; Sewell, K. (2013) [2012]. Code-Name Caesar: The Secret Hunt for U-boat 864 during World War II (repr. Souvenir Press, London ed.). New York: Berkley Caliber Books. ISBN 978-0-285-64203-4.
