= Jimmy Launders =

Royal Navy officer (1919–1988)

Captain Jimmy Launders DSO* DSC* ADC
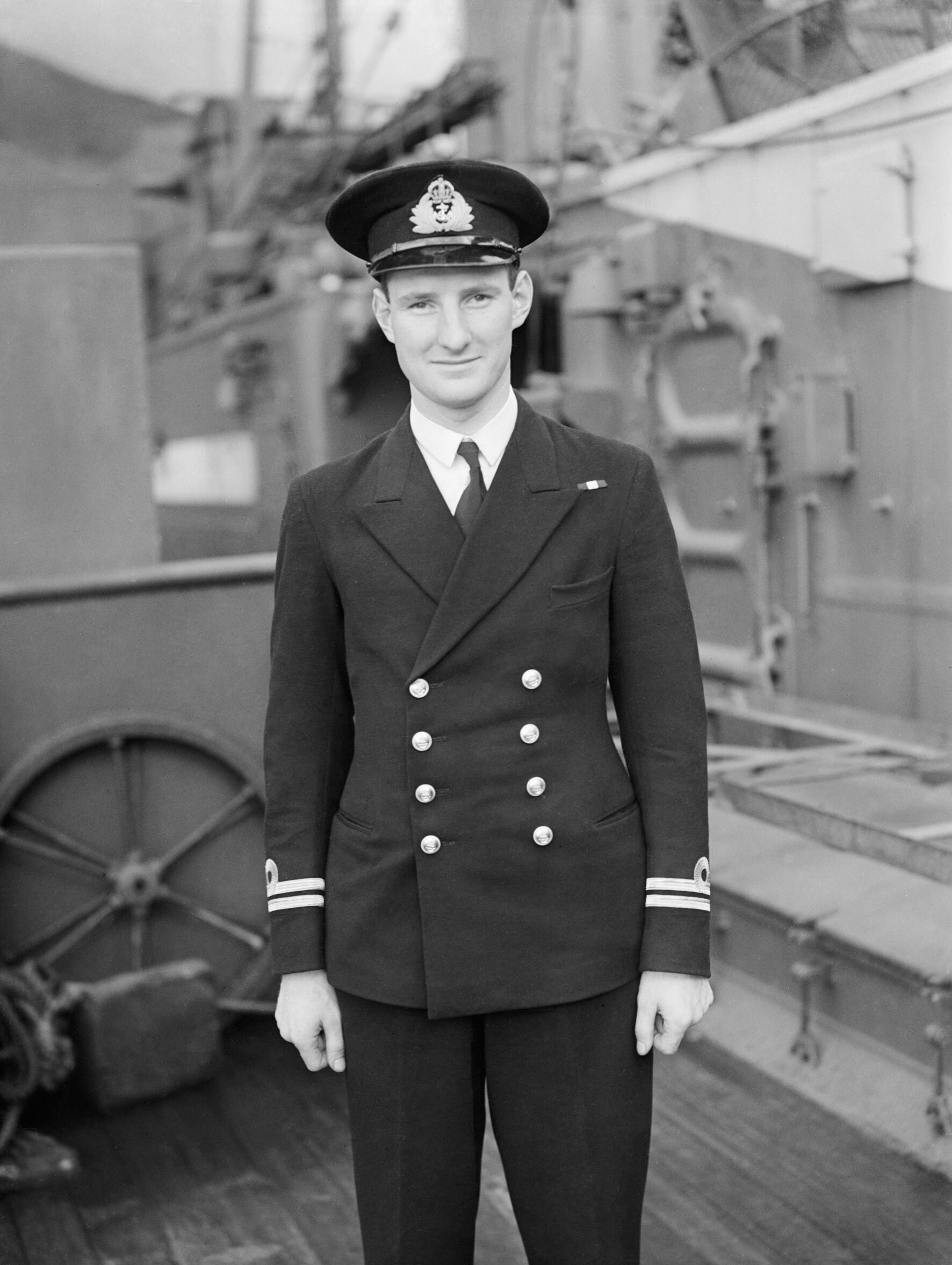
- Lt J S Launders DSC RN, on commissioning of Venturer at Holy Loch, 20 August 1943 (IWM A18834)
- Born: 1919
- Died: 1988 (aged 69)
- Military career
- Allegiance: United Kingdom
- Branch: Royal Navy
- Service years: 1938–1974
- Rank: Captain
- Nickname: Jimmy
- Commands: HMS Venturer
- Conflicts: Second World War
- Awards: DSO and Bar; DSC and Bar

Captain James Stuart Launders, DSO & Bar, DSC & Bar, ADC (1919–1988), was an officer in the Royal Navy during and after the Second World War. He retired from the service in 1974, but continued to serve in an unofficial capacity on training programs until his death in 1988. In addition to his reputation amongst his crew, colleagues, and historians as a brilliant, highly skilled, and courageous officer, Launders is remembered as the only submarine commander in history to have engaged and sunk an enemy submarine (U-864) using only his own unaided vessel (HMS Venturer) while both boats were fully submerged.

== Early Royal Navy career ==
In 1925, when he was five years old, his parents took him to the British colony known as the Uganda Protectorate. He spent his childhood "exploring" what is today Mount Elgon National Park and took many extended trips with his father into the far western part of the country in what would later become Bwindi Impenetrable National Park. Launders returned to England in late 1935 at the age of 16, attending The Skinners' School, before joining the Royal Navy as a cadet on 1 January 1938. Upon completion of his training, he was posted as a midshipman to the battlecruiser HMS Repulse on 1 January 1939. He was serving aboard Repulse when the war broke out.

== Second World War service ==
=== Assignment to Venturer and reputation ===
Though he would continue to serve aboard Repulse for more than two years, it was to be his last assignment to a surface vessel for some time. On 1 April 1941 (after the war had been raging for about a year and a half and the Battle of the Atlantic was well underway), Launders was posted to his first submarine assignment aboard HMS Umbra. In recognition of his outstanding service during that critical phase of the Battle of the Atlantic, Launders was awarded the Distinguished Service Cross (DSC) on 22 December 1942. He was subsequently promoted to lieutenant on 1 April 1943. His career was on a "fast track", and on 18 May 1943, he received his first command, one that would make him famous: Venturer.

Venturer was Launders' first submarine posting, but his intellect, quick thinking, and leadership had put him in position for just such a command. Venturer was a fast-attack "hunter-killer" sub, whose mission was to hunt for enemy shipping and other submarines, attack them, and to effect a speedy getaway without engaging in a prolonged action. Launders was a "rising star" in the Royal Navy submarine command at the time. a "boy-wonder with a genius for mathematics," which gave him a tremendous edge in making the necessary vector calculations (manual or minimally mechanical-computer assisted reckoning of speed and trajectories for targets, torpedoes, attacking vessels and currents) that were part of submarine warfare tactics of the day.

The Royal Navy staff's opinion of Launders' capabilities was apparently shared by his crew. Regarding his time aboard Venturer with Launders, former Royal Navy Sub Lieutenant John Frederick Watson (a retired geologist who served with Launders during the war aboard Venturer and was decorated "Awarded for Great Keenness and Devotion to Duty" for his actions during that time) stated:

It was very much a Band of Brothers. Only 37 in the crew and Launders was way ahead in terms of his experience, his knowledge, his abilities; it was obvious to the rest of us. Nobody thought to question what he decided to do.

Former Able Seaman and retired Royal Navy instructor Henry James Plummer also served aboard Venturer during the war with both Launders and Watson. Himself decorated ("Awarded for Courage, Cheerfulness, and Alertness"), Watson said of Launders:

We trusted him. We knew he was a good commander. We'd have gone to the end of the Earth with him…because he was that good.

King George VI also praised Launders, declaring him "...a fearless and skillful commander." Launders was awarded a bar to his DSC on 18 July 1944 for "outstanding courage, resolution and skill."

=== Action aboard Venturer ===
Venturer had sunk some thirteen German vessels during ten patrols over the previous twelve months, including the Type VIIC U-boat U-771 off Norway's Lofoten Islands on 11 November 1944, some 7 nautical miles (13 km) east of Andenes, Norway, resulting in Launders' appointment as a Companion of the Distinguished Service Order (DSO) "for courage, skill and undaunted devotion to duty". However Venturer's most notable feat was the sinking of U-864 on 9 February 1945, off Bergen, Norway, while both vessels were submerged.

==== Sinking of the U-864 ====
Launders was the commander of Venturer when, on 9 February 1945, in the North Sea west of Bergen, Norway, his submarine torpedoed and sank U-864, commanded by Korvettenkapitän Ralf-Reimar Wolfram. U-864 was a Type IX U-boat, designed for long, ocean-going voyages with limited re-supply. It was on a highly sensitive, long-range, covert mission, codenamed Operation Caesar, to deliver highly sensitive technology to their wartime ally, the Empire of Japan. U-864's top-secret manifest included jet-engine parts from the German Me 262 jet fighter plane that the Japanese were going to try to clone, missile guidance systems from Peenemünde, of the type used on the V-2 rocket, and many tonnes of mercury, a raw material that was in short supply in Japan that was vital to the industrial production of ordnance since it was a necessary component in the fabrication of detonators.

U-864 had put into the U-boat pens in Bergen to repair damage from having run aground during their first attempt to set off on the mission (they had to take very round-about routes that were often not well charted to avoid Allied anti-submarine warfare patrols in the main shipping channels). During the boat's layover there several days earlier, the pens were hit by an Allied bombing raid, but U-864 itself escaped serious damage. With her damage repaired, U-864 once again was underway for Japan.

However, their normally quiet engine started to make an abnormally loud, rhythmic noise that could be easily detected by any anti-submarine warfare equipment in the area. Wolfram decided to return to Bergen to repair the problem.

Neither he nor anyone in the Nazi high command knew that the Enigma code, Germany's top-secret naval encryption system, had been broken by British mathematician Alan Turing and his cryptanalytics team at Bletchley Park. All naval communications to and from the U-boat fleet were being read by the Allies, and they knew of Operation Caesar. Wishing to deny the Japanese any advantage that might extend the war in the Pacific, Royal Navy Submarine Command dispatched Venturer to intercept and destroy U-864.

Launders received a brief message from Royal Navy Submarine Command as to the estimated whereabouts of U-864 (with reasonable precision, somewhere near the island of Fedje, off Norway's southwest coast, just north of the pens at Bergen), along with instructions to destroy her. Launders set about the task, making one risky but calculated decision: he decided to switch off Venturer's ASDIC (a then-advanced form of sonar), which would severely limit their ability to detect other submarines, but would greatly reduce the chance of being detected themselves. They would rely purely on Venturer's hydrophone (a common, long-used, and far less sophisticated underwater acoustic detection device) to try to detect U-864. It was a huge gamble.

U-864 had already left the area recommended to Launders. Unfortunately for the U-boat, U-864's commander had decided once again to return to Bergen to repair an engine noise problem. The decision would bring U-864 right back past Fedje, where HMS Venturer was lurking.

Venturer's hydrophone operator noticed a strange sound which he could not identify. He at first thought that it sounded as though some local fisherman had started up a boat's diesel engine. Launders decided to track the strange noise. Then, due to poor adherence to proper periscope usage protocol on the part of the German crew, the officer of the watch on Venturer's periscope noticed another periscope poking up above the surface of the water. Alternatively, as the German submarine was submerged with one or both diesel engines running, the object sighted by the officer of the watch may well have been its snorkel. Combined with the hydrophone reports of the strange noise, which he determined to be coming from a submerged vessel, Launders surmised that they had found U-864.

Launders tracked U-864 by hydrophone (in itself a difficult feat), hoping it would surface and allow a clear shot. However, U-864 detected the presence of the British submarine and remained submerged and started to zig-zag. This made U-864 quite safe according to the assumptions of the time.

After several hours, it became clear that the U-boat was not going to surface, but Launders decided to attack anyway. It was theoretically possible to compute a firing solution in three dimensions, but this had never been attempted in practice because it was assumed that making the complex calculations would be impossible. Nevertheless, Launders and his crew did just that, making assumptions about U-864's defensive manoeuvers. Launders ordered the firing of all torpedoes in the four bow tubes (as a small, fast-attack boat, Venturer was equipped with only four in the bow, none in the stern, and carried only eight torpedoes), with a 17.5 second delay between each shot, and at variable depths. U-864 made a crash dive, straight into the path of the 4th torpedo. The result was catastrophic damage to U-864's hull, causing the German boat to instantaneously implode, with the loss of all hands. U-864 sank 31 nautical miles (57 km) from Bergen.

==== Aftermath of the U-864 engagement ====
For their actions, several crewmen aboard Venturer were decorated by the Royal Navy, and Launders himself was awarded a bar to his DSO "for gallantry, judgment and skill in a successful patrol." Launders became the first, and to date only, submarine commander to be publicly acknowledged as having sunk another submarine in combat while both vessels were submerged.

== After the war ==
After victory in Europe on 8 May 1945, Launders did not muster out of the Royal Navy, but continued to serve, receiving promotions to lieutenant commander in 1949 and commander in 1957. In the post-war years, he was posted to a number of different vessels and shore stations, held a number of staff posts, and was posted to NATO. He was a full 4-ring Captain of HMS Forth, looking to the 7th submarine squadron at Singapore 1968 to 1970. Launders retired from the Royal Navy in 1974.

Launders died in 1988 of natural causes at the age of 69.

== Service record ==
According to the Royal Navy's Historical Society, the service record of Launders is as follows:

- Cadet – 1 January 1938
- Midshipman – HMS Repulse – 1 January 1939
- Posted to HMS Umbra – 1 April 1941
- DSC – war patrols in the Mediterranean, 22 December 1942
- Promoted Lieutenant – 1 April 1943
- Posted to HMS Venturer 18 May 1943. He remained with her until the end of the war.
- Bar to DSC – war patrols, 18 July 1944
- DSO – For destruction of U-771, 1 November 1944
- Bar to DSO – for destruction of U-864, 9 February 1945
- 1946 – Off active service
- Posted to HMS Dolphin – Submarine depot, Portsmouth. January 1947
- Posted to HMS Dryad – Training unit, Navigation officer. 1949.
- Promoted Lieutenant Commander - 1 April 1949
- Posted HMS Alcide – A class submarine, 5 July 1951
- Posted to HMS President – Shore station, London, 1953
- Posted to HMS Terror – Far East Station, 1955, Staff
- Promoted to Commander – 30 June 1957
- Posted to HMS Vanguard – Reserve Fleet, 1959. Officer specialising in seamanship training.
- Posted to NATO – 1961
- Captain HMS Forth and Commander 7th Submarine Squadron at Singapore 1968 to 1970
- Chief of Staff, Rosyth Dockyard, May 1973 to August 1974
- Appointed Naval Aide-de-camp to Queen Elizabeth II on 7 July 1974.
- Placed on Retired List (Medically Unfit) on 29 November 1974.
