= British 21-inch torpedo =

British weapon used by ships, submarines, and aircraft

There have been a number of 21-inch (53.3 cm) torpedoes in service with the Royal Navy of the United Kingdom.

Torpedoes of 21-inch calibre were the largest torpedoes in common use in the RN. They were used by surface ships and submarines; aircraft used smaller 18-inch torpedoes.

== Mark I ==
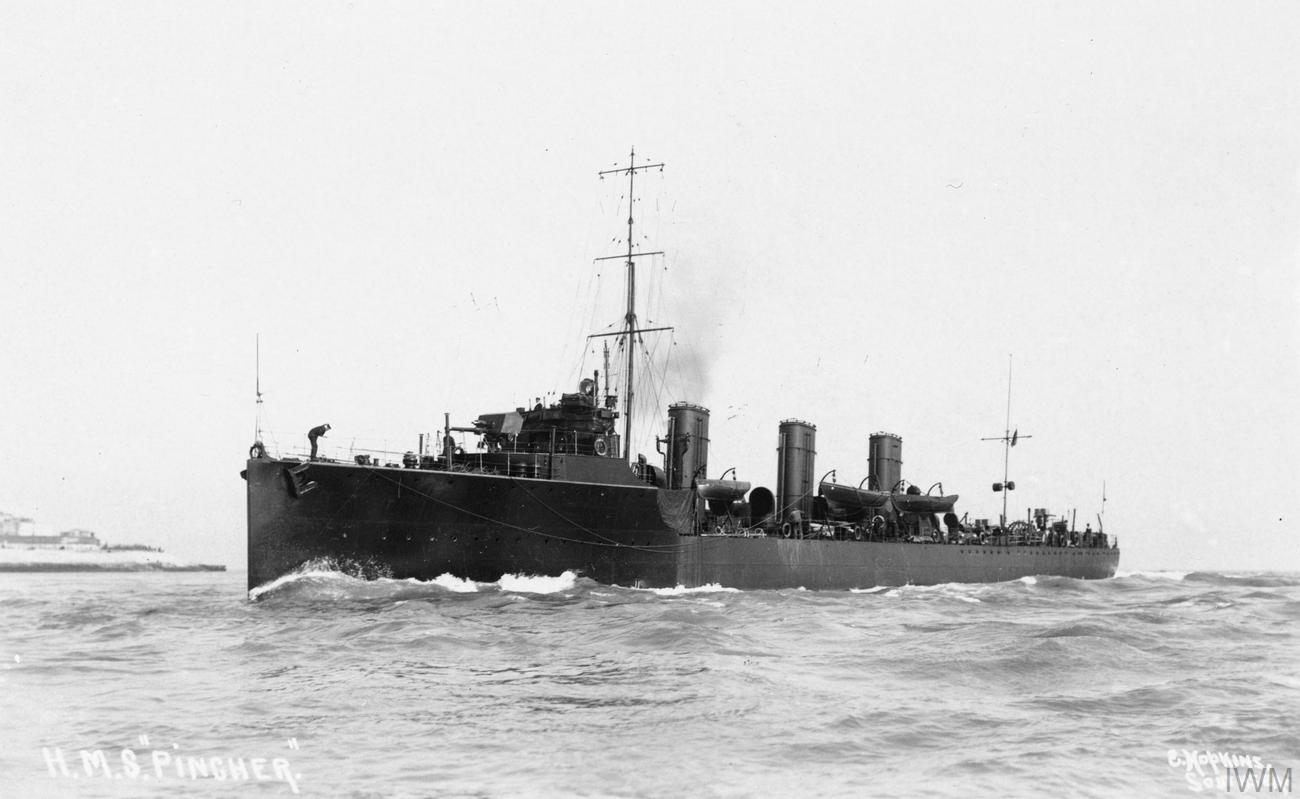
HMS Pincher, a Beagle-class destroyer, in 1910. These destroyers would become the primary users of the Mark I torpedoes.

The first British 21-inch torpedo came in two lengths, "Short" at 17 ft 10.5 in (5.45 m), and "Long" at 23 ft 1.25 in (7.04 m). The explosive charge was 200 lb (91 kg) of guncotton, increased later to 225 lb (102 kg). The torpedoes were first deployed in the field in 1912 and primarily used by the Beagle-class destroyers throughout most of their service during the First World War.

Specifications:

Mark I Short

- Entered service: 1910
- Weight: 2,100 lb (950 kg)
- Length: 17 ft 10.5 in (5.448 m)
- Explosive charge: 200 lb (91 kg) Wet guncotton
- Range and speed: 7,500 yd (6,900 m) at 16 kn (30 km/h), 1,000 yd (910 m) at 27 kn (50 km/h)

Mark I Long

- Entered service: 1910
- Weight: 2,800 lb (1,300 kg)
- Length: 23 ft 1.25 in (7.0422 m)
- Explosive charge: 200 lb (91 kg) Wet guncotton
- Range and speed: 12,000 yd (11,000 m) at 16 kn (30 km/h), 1,000 yd (910 m) at 27 kn (50 km/h)

== Mark II ==
21-inch Mark II
- Type: Heavy Torpedo
- Place of origin: United Kingdom

Service history
- In service: 1909 – Second World War
- Used by: RN
- Wars: First World War, Second World War

Production history
- Designed: 1909

Specifications
- Diameter: 21 in (530 mm)
- Warhead: TNT
- Warhead weight: 280 to 515 lb (127 to 234 kg)
- Engine: Wet Heater
- Operational range: 18,000 yd (16,000 m) max depending on model
- Maximum speed: 18 to 45 kn (33 to 83 km/h)

The Mark II, a prolific series of torpedoes used during the First World War, entered service in 1909. Development ran in parallel with the Mark I and shared multiple elements of its design. Developed by the Royal Navy Torpedo Factory design bureau in Greenock and manufactured at the Royal Gun Factory in Woolwich and the Royal Naval Torpedo Factory in Alexandria. During the early part of the Second World War, apart from some older British ships, it was used with the old US (destroyers-for-bases deal) Town-class destroyers provided to the UK.

During the First World War, the Mark II was primarily used by battleships and battlecruisers, as well as submarines fitted with 21-inch launch tubes, such as the L, M, and G classes. A wet heater design, it could run at speeds upwards of 45 knots (83 km/h). Accuracy and depth-keeping reliability were reduced at this high speed. All variants of the Mark II were outfitted at the factory with either a 44.5-knot or a 35-knot high speed setting, but not both.

The Royal Navy employed a system whereby successive modifications of torpedoes were marked with increasingly numerous asterisks. Other markings for the Mark II were suffixes specifying the type of launch tube hardware required for their employment: SL (side lug), HB (hook bracket), VB (a special modification for the foreign-specification torpedo tubes on HMS Canada, TB (a special modification for the foreign-specification torpedo tubes on HMS Chester (1915) and HMS Birkenhead (1915))

Specifications:

Mark II and Mark II SL

- Entered service: 1909
- Weight: 2,822 lb (1,280 kg) (light warhead), 2,948 lb (1,337 kg) (heavy warhead)
- Length: 22 ft (6.7 m)
- Explosive charge: 280 lb (130 kg) or 400 lb (180 kg) TNT
- Range and speed: 17,000 yd (16,000 m) at 18 kn (33 km/h), 14,000 yd (13,000 m) at 23 kn (43 km/h), 6,000 yd (5,500 m) at 35 kn (65 km/h), 4,200 yd (3,800 m) at 44.5 kn (82.4 km/h)
- Notes: No submarine variant; compatibility with submarine launch tubes would be developed in successive generations.

Mark II HB

- Entered service: 1909
- Weight: 2,827 lb (1,282 kg)
- Length: 22 ft (6.7 m)
- Explosive charge: 400 lb (180 kg) TNT
- Range and speed: 10,000 yd (9,100 m) at 28 kn (52 km/h), 4,000 yd (3,700 m) at 44 kn (81 km/h)
- Notes: The hook bracket variant of the Mark II was actually the first type ordered for production, though it was a modification of the principal design.

Mark II*

- Entered service: 1914
- Weight: 2,948 lb (1,337 kg)
- Length: 22 ft (6.7 m)
- Explosive charge: 400 lb (180 kg) TNT
- Range and speed: 17,000 yd (16,000 m) at 18 kn (33 km/h), 14,000 yd (13,000 m) at 23 kn (43 km/h), 6,000 yd (5,500 m) at 35 kn (65 km/h), 4,200 yd (3,800 m) at 44.5 kn (82.4 km/h)

Mark II** and Mark II** SL

- Entered service: 1914
- Weight: 2,948 lb (1,337 kg)
- Length: 22 ft (6.7 m)
- Explosive charge: 400 lb (180 kg) TNT
- Range and speed: 18,000 yd (16,000 m) at 18 kn (33 km/h), 15,000 yd (14,000 m) at 23 kn (43 km/h), 6,000 yd (5,500 m) at 35 kn (65 km/h), 4,500 yd (4,100 m) at 44.5 kn (82.4 km/h)

Mark II*** and Mark II*** SL

- Entered service: 1914
- Weight: 2,948 lb (1,337 kg)
- Length: 22 ft (6.7 m)
- Explosive charge: 400 lb (180 kg) TNT
- Range and speed: 18,000 yd (16,000 m) at 18 kn (33 km/h), 15,000 yd (14,000 m) at 23 kn (43 km/h), 6,000 yd (5,500 m) at 35 kn (65 km/h), 4,500 yd (4,100 m) at 44.5 kn (82.4 km/h)
- Notes: In submarine use, the Mark II*** had speed settings of 10,750 yd (9,830 m) at 29 kn (54 km/h) and 4,200 yd (3,800 m) at 45 kn (83 km/h).

Mark II*** VB

- Entered service: 1914
- Weight: 2,865 lb (1,300 kg)
- Length: 21 ft 4 in (6.50 m)
- Explosive charge: 302 lb (137 kg) TNT
- Range and speed: 6,000 yd (5,500 m) at 27 kn (50 km/h), 3,500 yd (3,200 m) at 36 kn (67 km/h), 1,000 yd (910 m) at 41 kn (76 km/h)
- Notes: Special modification designed to fit foreign-specification launch tubes on HMS Canada.

Mark II*** TB

- Entered service: 1914
- Weight: 2,963 lb (1,344 kg)
- Length: 22 ft (6.7 m)
- Explosive charge: 400 lb (180 kg) TNT
- Range and speed: 10,000 yd (9,100 m) at 28 kn (52 km/h), 4,000 yd (3,700 m) at 44 kn (81 km/h)
- Notes: Special modification designed to fit foreign-specification launch tubes on HMS Chester (1915) and HMS Birkenhead (1915).

Mark II****

- Entered service: 1915
- Weight: 2,950 lb (1,340 kg)
- Length: 22 ft (6.7 m)
- Explosive charge: 400 lb (180 kg) TNT
- Range and speed: 18,000 yd (16,000 m) at 18 kn (33 km/h), 15,000 yd (14,000 m) at 23 kn (43 km/h), 6,000 yd (5,500 m) at 35 kn (65 km/h), 4,500 yd (4,100 m) at 44.5 kn (82.4 km/h)
- Notes: In submarine use, the Mark II**** had speed settings of 10,750 yd (9,830 m) at 29 kn (54 km/h) and 4,200 yd (3,800 m) at 45 kn (83 km/h).

Mark II*****

- Entered service: 1916
- Weight: 2,953 lb (1,339 kg)
- Length: 22 ft (6.7 m)
- Explosive charge: 400 lb (180 kg) TNT
- Range and speed: 18,000 yd (16,000 m) at 19 kn (35 km/h), 15,000 yd (14,000 m) at 24 kn (44 km/h), 6,000 yd (5,500 m) at 35 kn (65 km/h), 4,500 yd (4,100 m) at 45 kn (83 km/h)
- Notes: In submarine use, the Mark II***** had speed settings of 10,750 yd (9,830 m) at 29 kn (54 km/h) and 4,200 yd (3,800 m) at 45 kn (83 km/h).

== Mark III ==
The 21-inch Mark III designation was applied to two separate torpedoes. One was the RGF Mark III, manufactured at the Royal Gun Factory in Woolwich. The RGF Mark III incorporated features of the RGF Mark II***, as well as a novel design for the water bottle, a different gas generator, a double reducer adapted for the use of heavy fuel oil, and a direct oil injection system which was projected to increase the weapon's endurance to 13,000 yd (12,000 m). This was not realized, causing the weapon's introduction to be indefinitely postponed, favor being passed on to improved variants of the Mark II. The other was the Whitehead Mark III produced at the Whitehead factory in Weymouth, a torpedo produced for foreign export in two variants, the Mark III and Mark III*. Both variants were propelled by four-cylinder engines. At the outbreak of the First World War, the Royal Navy purchased and introduced into service all stocks of Whitehead Mark II and Mark III foreign export torpedoes present at the Weymouth works.

Specifications:

RGF Mark III

- Prototype date: 1915
- Weight: 2,815 lb (1,277 kg)
- Length: 22 ft (6.7 m)
- Explosive charge: 400 lb (180 kg) TNT
- Range and speed: 11,700 yd (10,700 m) at 29 kn (54 km/h)

Whitehead Mark III

- Entered service: 1914
- Weight: 2,697 lb (1,223 kg)
- Length: 20 ft 10 in (6.35 m)
- Explosive charge: 300 lb (140 kg) TNT
- Range and speed: 6,000 yd (5,500 m) at 27 kn (50 km/h), 3,500 yd (3,200 m) at 36 kn (67 km/h), 1,000 yd (910 m) at 41 kn (76 km/h)
- Notes: Maximal range of 10,000 yd (9,100 m) at an unknown speed.

Whitehead Mark III*

- Entered service: 1914
- Weight: 2,912 lb (1,321 kg)
- Length: 22 ft 4 in (6.81 m)
- Explosive charge: 330 lb (150 kg) TNT
- Range and speed: 10,000 yd (9,100 m) at 25 kn (46 km/h), 3,500 yd (3,200 m) at 38 kn (70 km/h)
- Notes: Maximal range of 12,000 yd (11,000 m) at an unknown speed.

== Mark IV ==
21-inch Mark IV
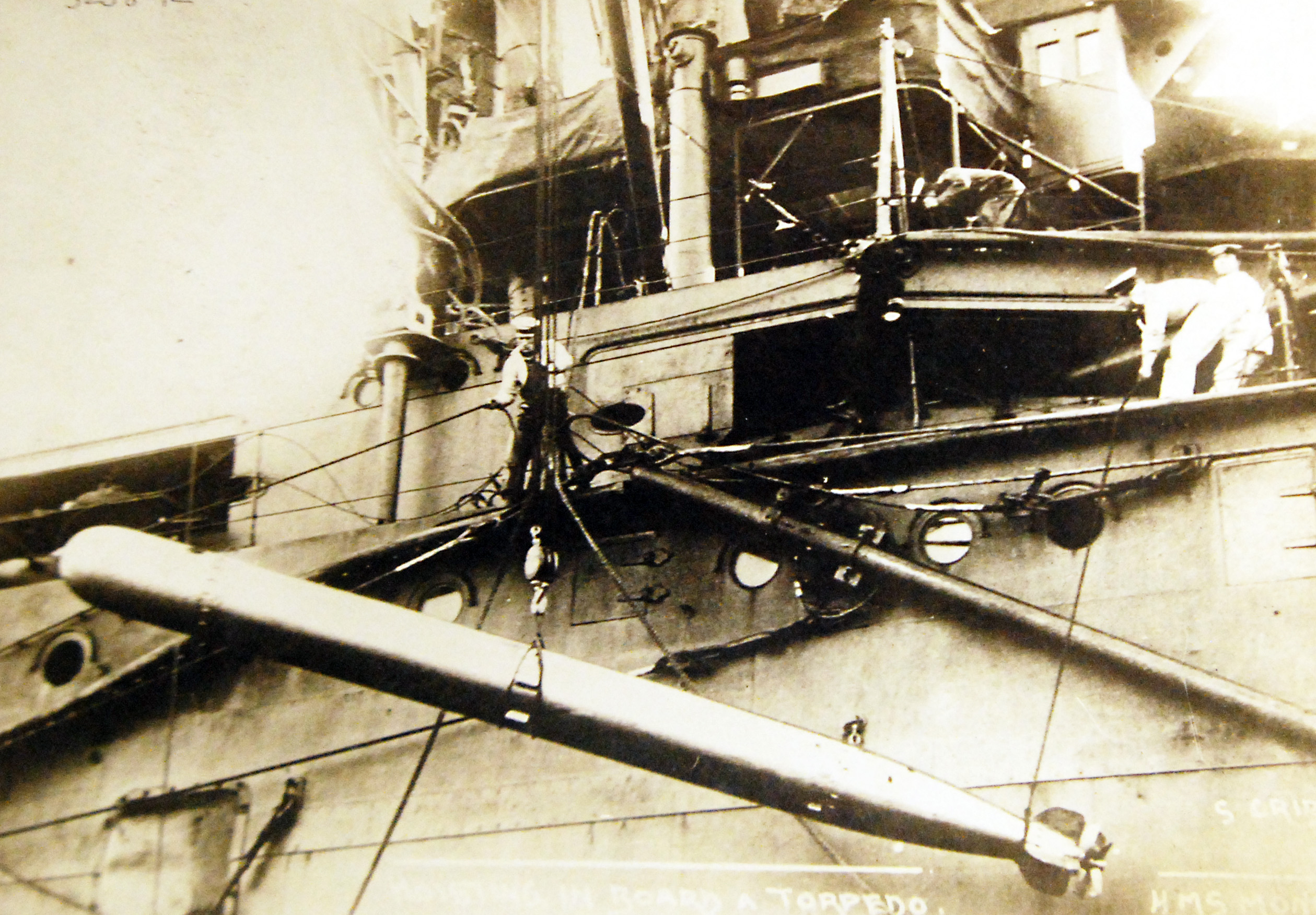
- A Mark IV torpedo being hoisted onto HMS Monarch, an Orion-class battleship, during the First World War.
- Type: Torpedo
- Place of origin: United Kingdom

Service history
- In service: 1916 – Second World War
- Used by: RN
- Wars: First World War, Second World War

Production history
- Designed: 1912

Specifications
- Mass: 3,206 lb (1,454 kg)
- Length: 22 ft 7.5 in (6.896 m)
- Diameter: 21 in (530 mm)
- Warhead: TNT
- Warhead weight: 515 lb (234 kg)
- Engine: Wet Heater
- Operational range: 8,000 to 13,500 yd (7,300 to 12,300 m)
- Maximum speed: 25 to 35 kn (46 to 65 km/h)

The Mark IV torpedo was the principal British torpedo of World War I. Designed 1912, initially available 1915, adopted for service 1916. Used by destroyers, torpedo boats, and other surface ships equipped with 21-inch torpedo tubes, such as the Royal Sovereign-class battleships. In the Second World War they were carried as auxiliary armament on submarines and various surface ships, including HMS Hood.

Specifications:

Mark IV

- Entered service: 1916
- Weight: Approximately 3,100–3,200 lb (1,400–1,500 kg)
- Length: 22 ft 2.5 in (6.769 m) to 22 ft 5 in (6.83 m)
- Explosive charge: 400 or 500 lb (180 or 230 kg) TNT
- Range and speed: 4,500 yd (4,100 m) at 44.5 kn (82.4 km/h), 15,000 yd (14,000 m) at 25 kn (46 km/h), 18,000 yd (16,000 m) at 21 kn (39 km/h)
- Notes: Two warhead options were available, the IVa (400 lbs) and the IVb (500 lbs). Depth keeping was extremely unreliable at the 44.5-knot speed setting, prompting a suggestion to limit the top speed to 35 knots.

Mark IV*

- Entered service: 1917
- Weight: Approximately 3,100–3,200 lb (1,400–1,500 kg)
- Length: 22 ft 2.5 in (6.769 m) to 22 ft 5 in (6.83 m)
- Explosive charge: 400 or 500 lb (180 or 230 kg) TNT
- Range and speed: 4,500 yd (4,100 m) at 44.5 kn (82.4 km/h), 6,000 yd (5,500 m) at 35 kn (65 km/h), 11,000 yd (10,000 m) at 29 kn (54 km/h), 15,000 yd (14,000 m) at 25 kn (46 km/h), 18,000 yd (16,000 m) at 21 kn (39 km/h)
- Notes: Four speed settings and an improved gyro control gear. The Mark IV* was outfitted at the factory with either a 44.5-knot or a 35-knot high speed setting, but not both.

Mark IV Late

- Entered service: Circa 1930s
- Weight: 3,206 lb (1,454 kg)
- Length: 22 ft 7.5 in (6.896 m)
- Explosive charge: 515 lb (234 kg) TNT
- Range and speed (surface vessel variant): 8,000 yd (7,300 m) at 35 kn (65 km/h), 10,000 yd (9,100 m) at 29 kn (54 km/h), 13,500 yd (12,300 m) at 25 kn (46 km/h)
- Range and speed (submarine variant): 6,000 yd (5,500 m) at 40 kn (74 km/h), 9,500 yd (8,700 m) at 30 kn (56 km/h)
- Notes: Retrofitted older torpedoes in service during the Second World War. Issued to older warships and motor torpedo boats equipped with 21-inch launch tubes, as well as submarines.

== Mark V ==
21-inch Mark V
- Type: Torpedo
- Place of origin: United Kingdom

Production history
- Designed: 1917

Specifications
- Length: 23 ft 4 in (7.1 m)
- Diameter: 21 in (530 mm)
- Engine: Wet Heater
- Operational range: 5,000 to 13,600 yd (4,600 to 12,400 m)
- Maximum speed: 20 to 40 kn (37 to 74 km/h)

The Mark V was used by the A and B-class destroyers and, with modification, by the Kent-class heavy cruisers.

== Mark VII ==
21-inch Mark VII
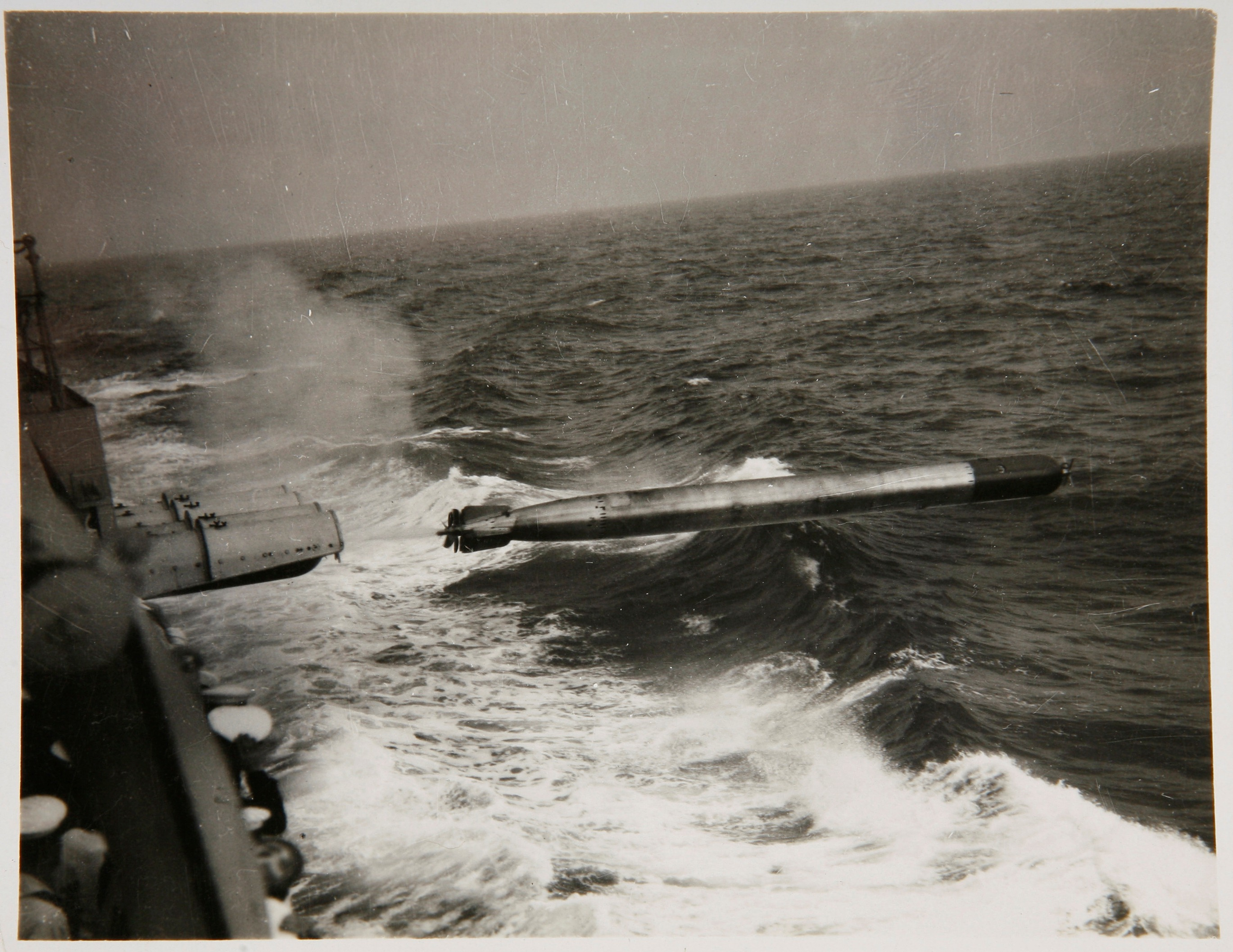
- Launch of a Mark VII torpedo from HMAS Australia, during trials in 1927.
- Type: Heavy Torpedo
- Place of origin: United Kingdom

Service history
- In service: Second World War
- Used by: RN

Production history
- Designed: 1922

Specifications (VIIC)
- Length: 25 ft 6 in (7.77 m)
- Diameter: 21 in (530 mm)
- Warhead: TNT
- Warhead weight: 740 lb (340 kg)
- Engine: Wet heater
- Operational range: 5,700 yd (5,200 m)
- Maximum speed: 35 kn (65 km/h)

The Mark VII was issued for use on the British heavy cruisers, i.e. cruisers with 8-inch guns. Designed in 1922, originally for the County-class cruisers that were built in the post-Washington Naval Treaty period.

The power came from the use of oxygen-enriched air, though torpedo stocks were converted to run on normal air at the start of the Second World War. The Mark VII would be replaced by the Mark IX as opportunity offered.

Specifications:

Mark VII

- Entered service: 1925
- Propulsion: Wet heater (kerosene-air, oxygen enriched)
- Weight: 4,106 lb (1,862 kg)
- Length: 25 ft 6 in (7.77 m)
- Explosive charge: 740 lb (340 kg) TNT
- Range and speed: 16,000 yd (15,000 m) at 33 kn (61 km/h)

Mark VIIC

- Entered service: 1939
- Propulsion: Wet heater (shale oil-air)
- Weight: 4,106 lb (1,862 kg)
- Length: 25 ft 6 in (7.77 m)
- Explosive charge: 740 lb (340 kg) TNT
- Range and speed: 5,700 yd (5,200 m) at 35 kn (65 km/h)
- Notes: Designated "C" for "Converted". Remnant stocks were refurbished at the outbreak of war in 1939. Conventional compressed air oxidizer, shale oil reactant. A mere nine units of the Mark VIIC were expended during the Second World War.

== Mark VIII ==
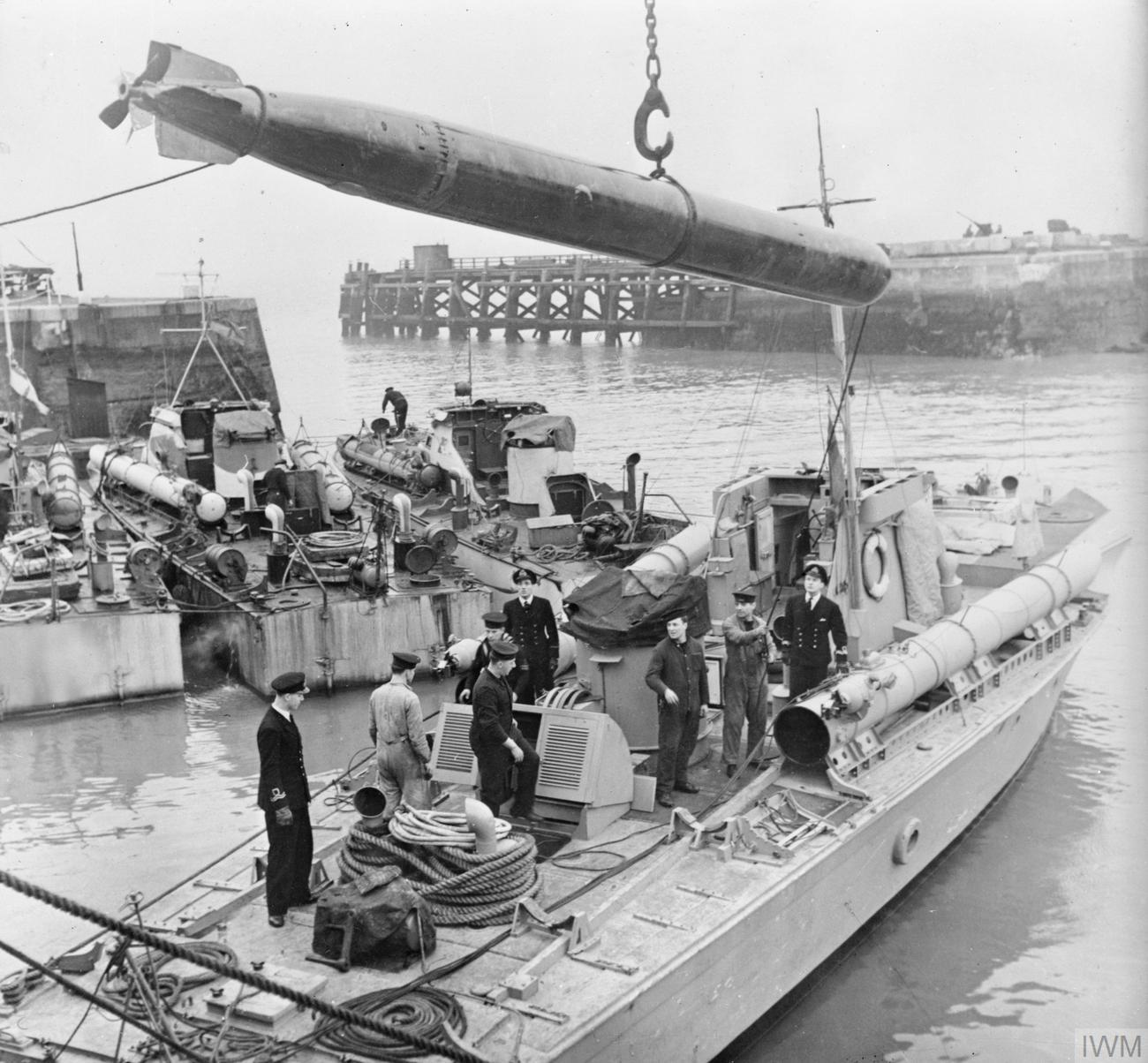
A Mark VIII torpedo being loaded onto MTB 232 in Felixstowe Harbor, 1943.

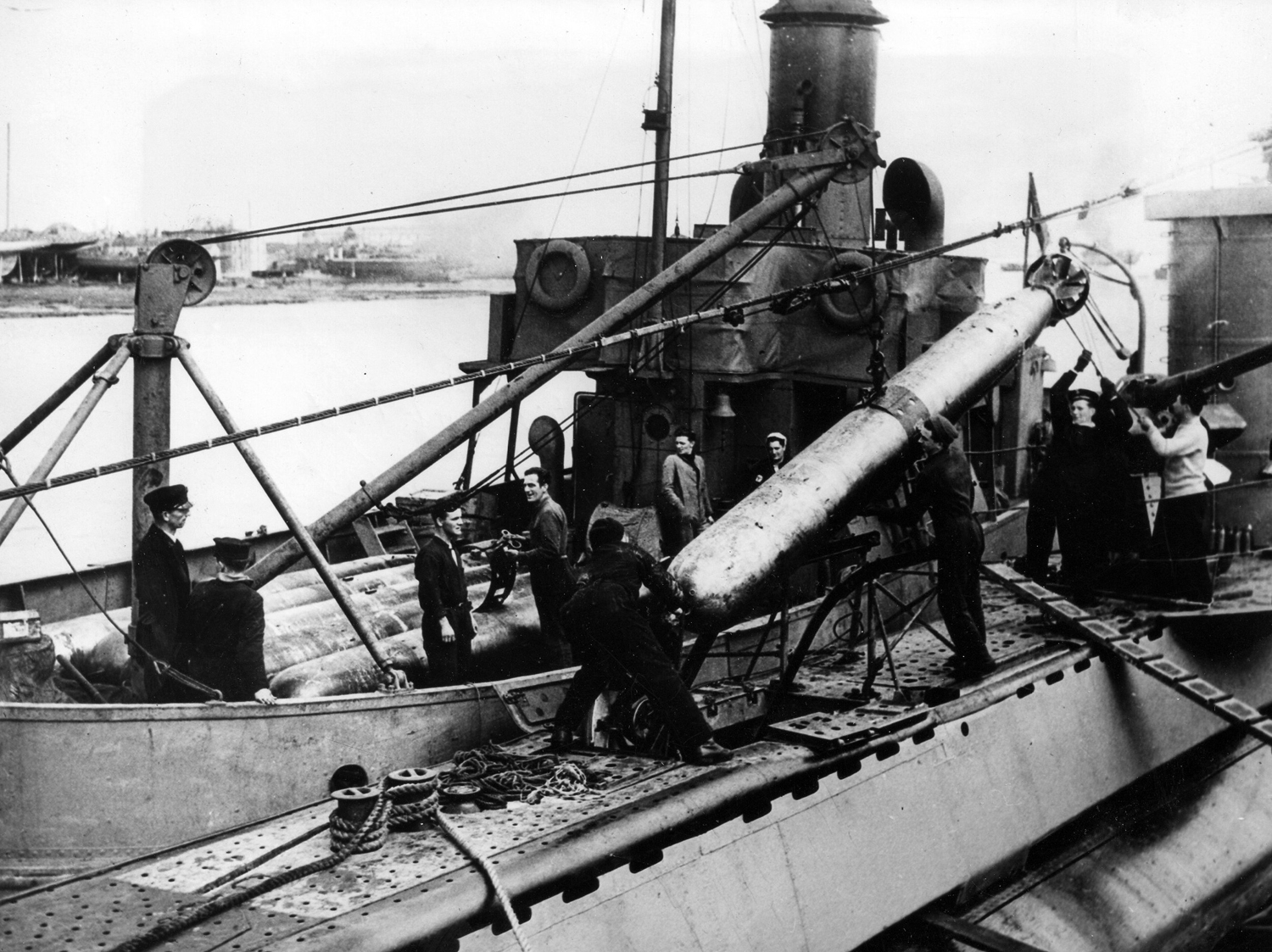
Mark VIII torpedoes being loaded onto the Polish Navy submarine ORP Sokół.

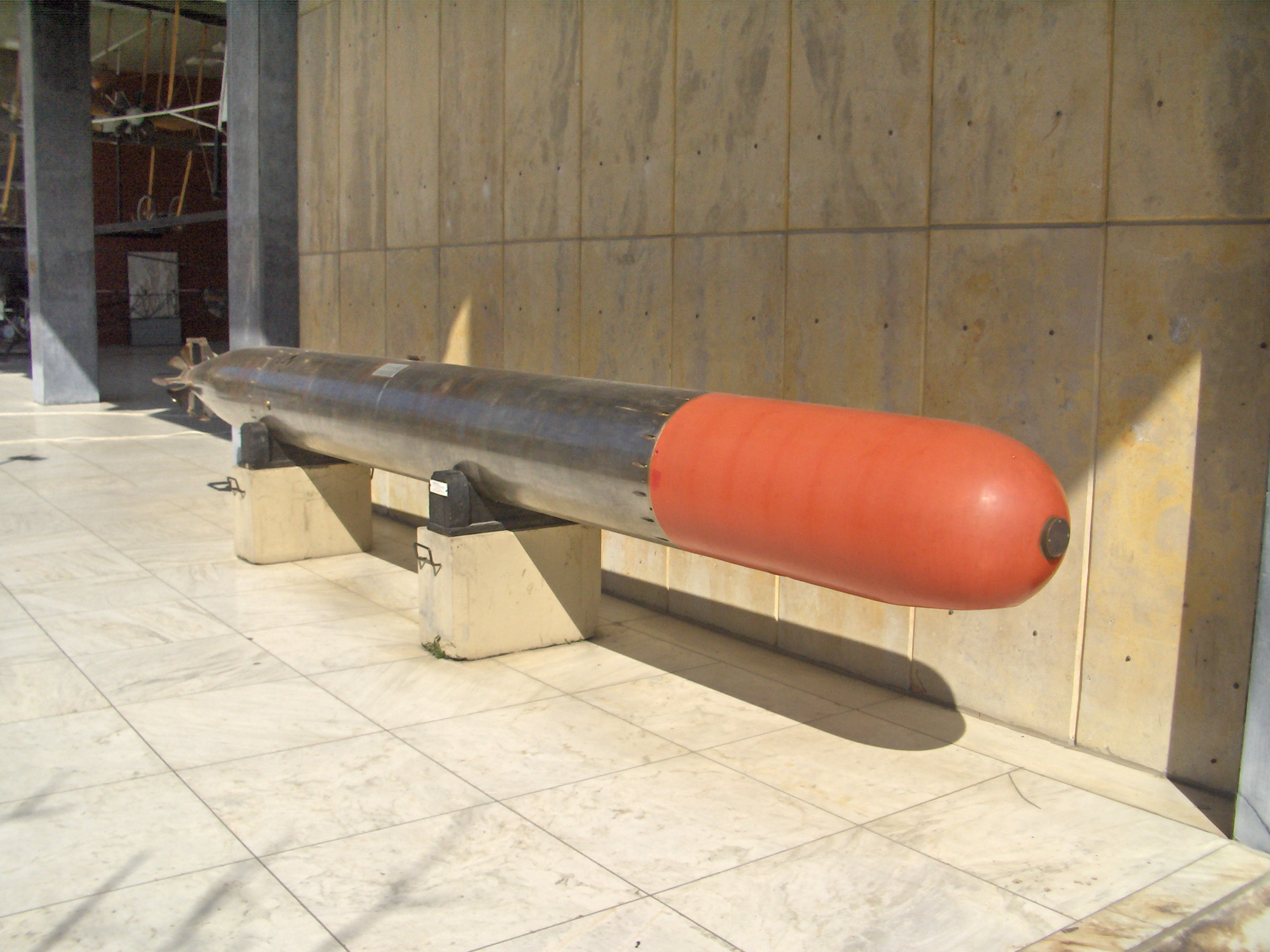
A Mark VIII* (Mark VIII Mod 1) torpedo exhibit at the Athens War Museum, Athens, Greece. Manufactured in 1937 and carried by the submarine Papanikolis.

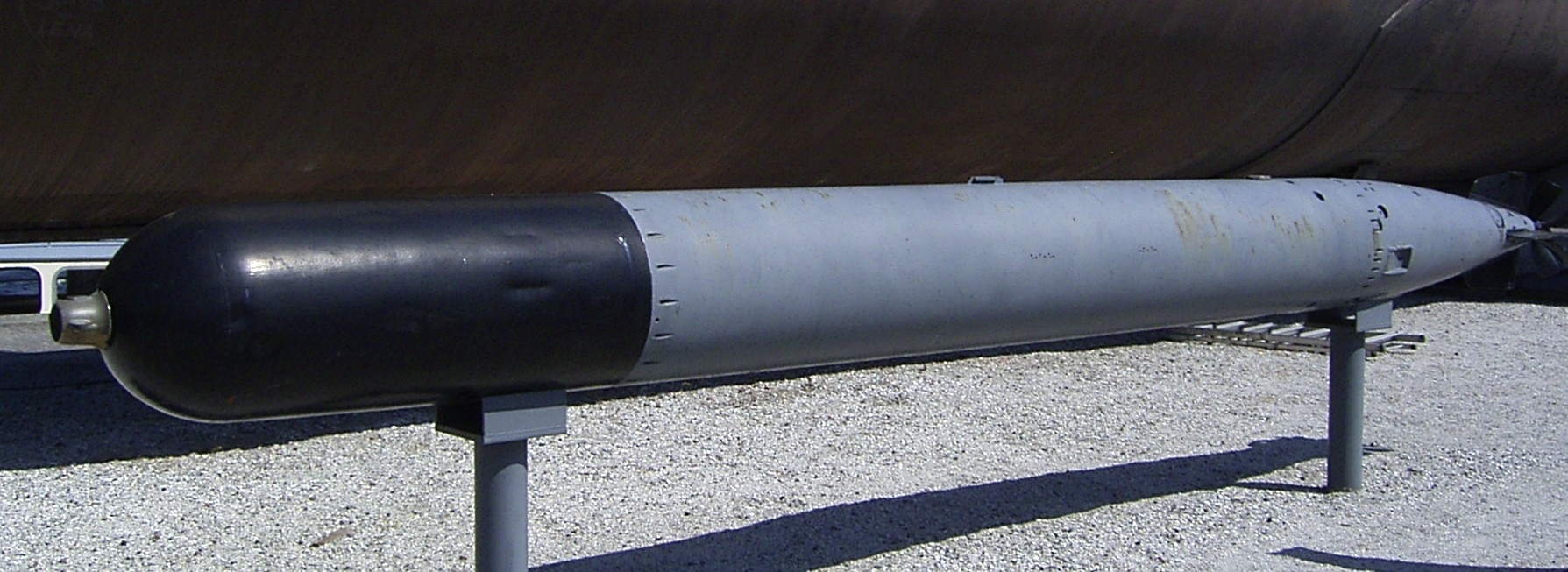
A Mark VIII Mod 4 torpedo exhibit at the German Naval Museum, Wilhelmshaven, Germany. Located in front of submarine U-10.

The Mark VIII was designed circa 1925 and was the first British burner cycle design torpedo. It was used from 1927 on all submarines, beginning with the later versions of the L class and the Odin class class, as well as motor torpedo boats. The principal World War II version was the improved Mark VIII**, used far more than any other torpedo in service, with 3,732 being expended by September 1944 (56.4% of the total number of torpedoes used by Britain during the war). In 1950–1951, the only system available for a Royal Navy submarine to attack another submerged target was the Mark VIII; active homing variants of the Mark VIII and Mark IX were being worked on in 1945, without success. Considerable self-noise and reverberation hampered the effort, and the project was halted with funding being cut off as the war ended. During trials, the Mark VIII achieved a test depth of 200 ft (61 m) without problems, but the production units were limited to a maximal depth of 44 ft (13 m) by their depth control mechanisms.

At the beginning of the 1960s, the Mark VIII was the only feasibly effective anti-surface ship weapon available to the Royal Navy submarine service. The Mark 20 Bidder, while capable of hitting surface targets, lacked the speed to chase down warships. During the torpedo capability crisis, in 1969, Admiral Michael Pollock, Flag Officer Submarines, proposed several possible solutions. Proposals included purchase of the American Mark 45 ASTOR, the Mark 40 Mod 1 nuclear-armed lightweight torpedo, the UUM-44 SUBROC, or modification of the Mark VIII to be fitted with a WE177A nuclear warhead, with a variable yield of 0.5-10 kilotons. The torpedo remained in service with the Royal Navy in a training role until the 1990s, and was used by the Royal Norwegian Navy (Coastal Artillery: Kaholmen torpedo battery at Oscarsborg Fortress) until 1993.

Specifications:

Mark VIII

- Entered service: 1927
- Weight: 3,452 lb (1,566 kg)
- Length: 21 ft 7 in (6.58 m)
- Explosive charge: 750 lb (340 kg) TNT
- Range and speed: 5,000 yd (4,600 m) at 40 kn (74 km/h)

Mark VIII* and Mark VIII*E

- Entered service: 1936
- Explosive charge: 722 lb (327 kg) Torpex
- Range and speed: 7,000 yd (6,400 m) at 41 kn (76 km/h) (Mark VIII*); 6,400 yd (5,900 m) at 41 kn (76 km/h) (Mark VIII*E)
- Notes: Mark VIII*E was a variant for externally-mounted torpedo tubes, with smaller propellers; this variant continued to be produced throughout the war. The Mark VIII*E was also compatible with internal launch tubes.

Mark VIII**

- Entered service: 1940
- Explosive charge: 722 lb (327 kg) Torpex, later increased to 805 lb (365 kg) Torpex
- Max depth setting: 44 ft (13 m)
- Range and speed: 5,000 yd (4,600 m) at 45.6 kn (84.5 km/h), 7,000 yd (6,400 m) at 41 kn (76 km/h) (light warhead); 4,570 yd (4,180 m) at 45.5 kn (84.3 km/h), 6,400 yd (5,900 m) at 41 kn (76 km/h) (heavy warhead)
- Notes: Most prolific British torpedo during the Second World War. Predominantly fitted with the heavy warhead.

Mark VIII***

- Entered service: 1960
- Weight: 3,384 lb (1,535 kg)
- Length: 22 ft (6.7 m)
- Explosive charge: 805 lb (365 kg) Torpex
- Max depth setting: 60 ft (18 m)
- Range and speed: 11,000 yd (10,000 m) at 41 kn (76 km/h), 15,000 yd (14,000 m) at 35 kn (65 km/h)
- Notes: First postwar modernization and service life extension. Speeds were slightly reduced in exchange for greatly increased accuracy, reliability, and range.

Mark 8 Mod 4

- Entered service: 1965
- Notes: Final modernization and service life extension. The policy of denoting successive modifications with increasingly numerous asterisks was finally ended. A Mark 8 Mod 4 was the very last torpedo to be launched at the Arrochar torpedo range, on 19 March 1986.

The Mark VIII was used in two particularly notable incidents:

- On 9 February 1945 the Royal Navy submarine HMS Venturer sank the German submarine U-864 with four Mark VIII** torpedoes. This remains the only historically acknowledged intentional sinking of one submarine by another while both were submerged.
- On 2 May 1982 the Royal Navy submarine HMS Conqueror sank the Argentine cruiser ARA General Belgrano with two Mark VIII Mod 4 torpedoes during the Falklands War. This is the first sinking of a surface ship by a nuclear-powered submarine in wartime and the second (of four) sinkings of a surface ship by any submarine since the end of World War II. The other three sinkings were of the Indian frigate INS Khukri, the South Korean corvette ROKS Cheonan and the Iranian frigate IRIS Dena.

== Mark IX ==
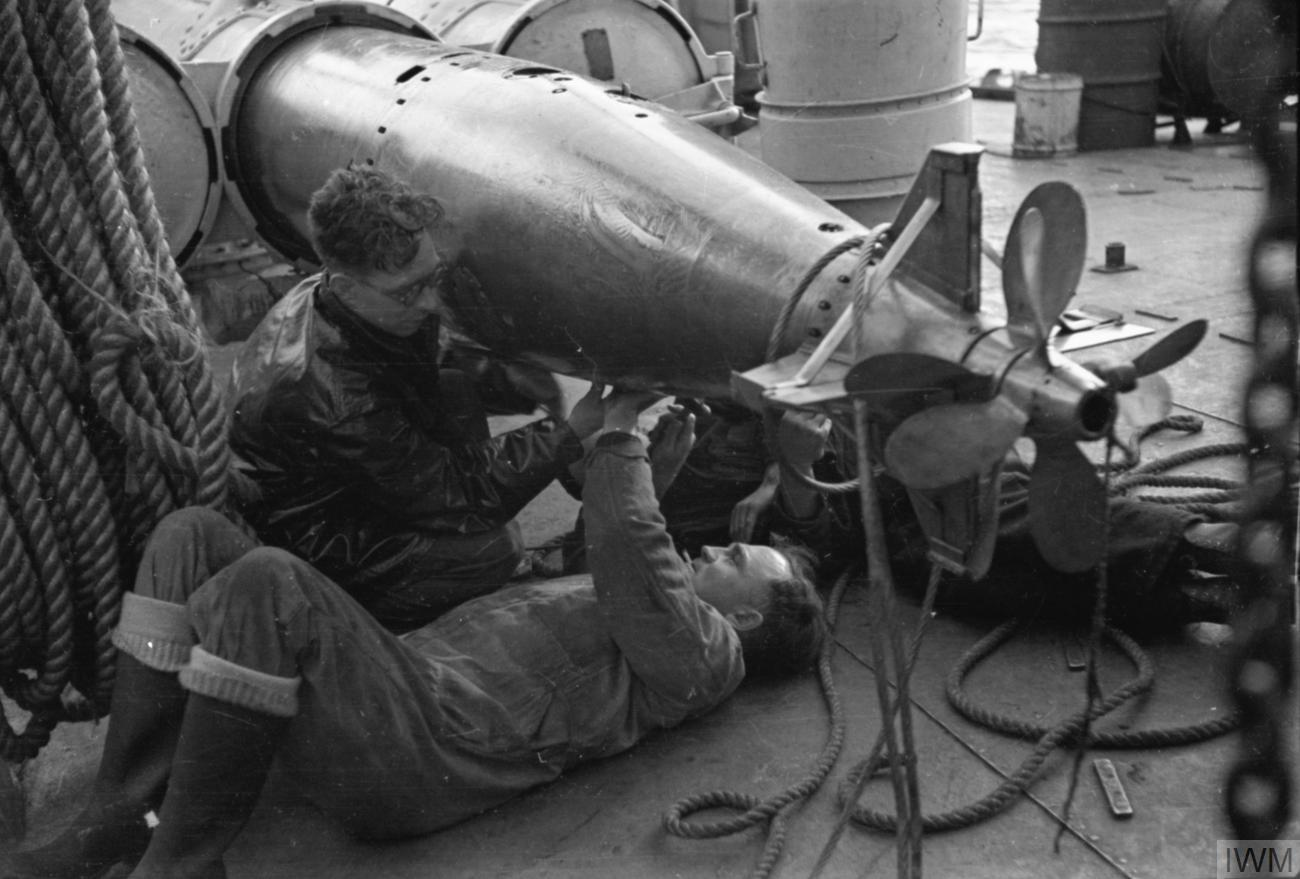
A Mark IX torpedo undergoing maintenance while loaded in a destroyer's triple tube mounting.

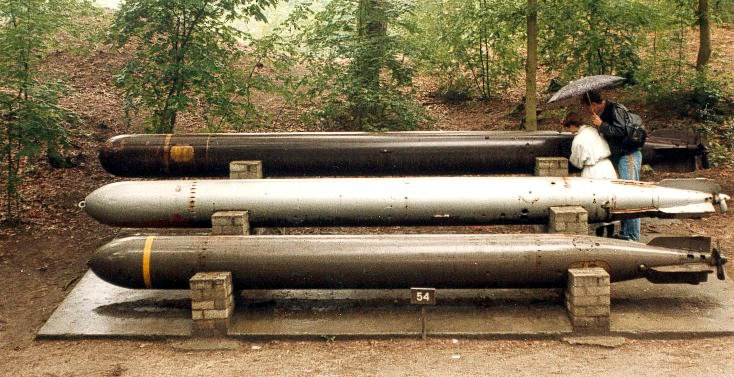
A late-model Mark IX torpedo exhibit at the Overloon War Museum in Overloon, Netherlands. The Mark IX is the first from the top.

The Mark IX was designed circa 1928 and first deployed in 1930, with the design being considerably improved by 1939. The Mark IX was a larger and longer-range sibling to the Mark VIII, employing a very similar four-cylinder radial kerosene-air burner-cycle propulsion system. It was used on the Leander-class cruiser and later cruisers, A- and B-class destroyers, and later destroyer classes. The Mark IX replaced the old Mark VII torpedo in some 8 in (200 mm) gun cruisers during the war. The principal version used during the Second World War was the Mark IX**, first issued to J- and K-class destroyers in 1939. In 1943 it was decided to further improve the Mark IX** by lengthening it by 12 inches (30.5 cm), and the weapon mass limit to 4,000 lb (1,800 kg), up to the capacity of torpedo tubes and ships under construction. Nitromethane-augmented propulsion was considered, but its implementation required too many alterations to be practical. The final version of what would have become Mark IX*** took up the extra space by enlarging the warhead to 930 lb (420 kg) of Torpex. None were in service by the end of the war in 1945, by which time the enlarged warhead became unnecessary. The Mark IX torpedo remained in service throughout the 1960s.

Specifications:

Mark IX

- Entered service: 1930
- Weight: 3,732 lb (1,693 kg)
- Length: 286.5 in (7.28 m)
- Explosive charge: 727 lb (330 kg) TNT
- Range and speed: 10,500 yd (9,600 m) at 36 kn (67 km/h), 13,500 yd (12,300 m) at 30 kn (56 km/h)

Mark IX*

- Explosive charge: 727 lb (330 kg) TNT
- Range and speed: 11,000 yd (10,000 m) at 36 kn (67 km/h), 14,000 yd (13,000 m) at 30 kn (56 km/h)

Mark IX**

- Entered service: 1939
- Explosive charge: 810 lb (370 kg) Torpex
- Range and speed: 11,000 yd (10,000 m) at 41 kn (76 km/h), 15,000 yd (14,000 m) at 35 kn (65 km/h)

== Mark X ==
From 1939, used by submarines, motor torpedo boats and destroyers from other navies such as the Grom-class destroyers.

== Mark XI ==
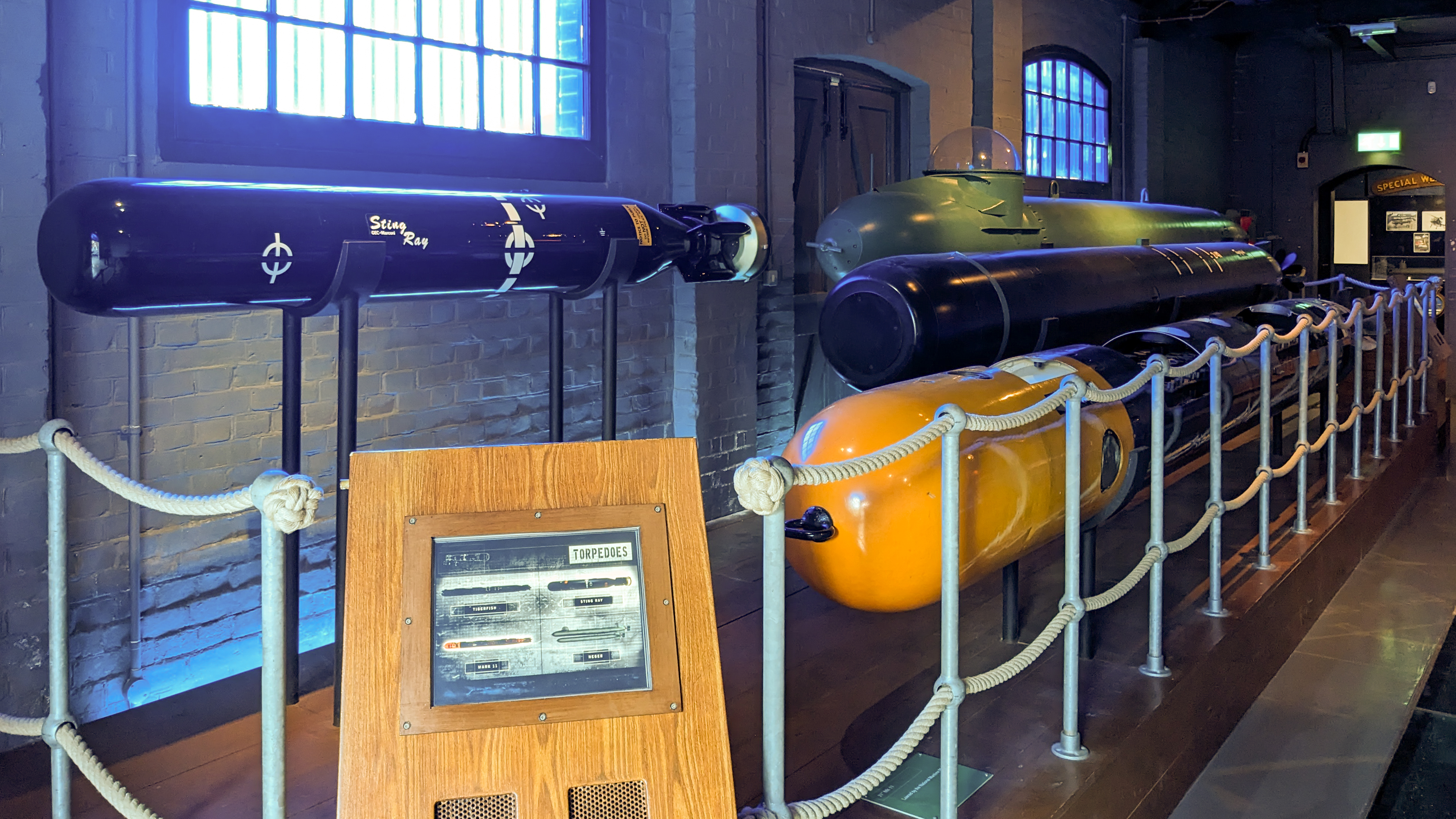
Several torpedoes at the Explosion Museum of Naval Firepower at Priddy's Hard. The Mark XI is the yellow-tipped unit at the right.

The Mark XI was a reverse-engineered copy of the German G7e, developed after samples of the G7e(TII) were captured in 1940. Prior to the Second World War, the Royal Navy was mostly uninterested in electric torpedoes as they had poor performance compared to the piston-driven units already in service, and trackless torpedoes were deemed of dubious use, since their low speeds and stealthy nature rendered them most suited to sneak attacks against slow vessels, e.g. unrestricted submarine warfare. Following the experience of submarine warfare during the First World War, the British tended to have a cold attitude towards stealthy torpedo attacks in general (for more information, see use of the Jolly Roger by submarines).

The project to reverse-engineer the G7e(TII) torpedoes had a low priority until 1942 and consequently not much work was done. The project commenced in earnest after the Royal Navy saw a need for a weapon which did not leave a bubble track on the surface in the Mediterranean Sea. The first prototype was ready in May 1943; obsolete TNT filler was used for the warhead, further underlining the low priority of the weapon. The first production rounds were finally issued to the fleet in August 1944 and some were delivered to the Far East, with the war ending before any were used in action. Due to the size and weight of the weapon, units were issued to surface warships only, mostly destroyers.

The Mark XI never went into volume production. After the war, when the British started to develop ASW homing torpedoes, electric propulsion was revisited for further development since it was inherently quieter. Self-noise, the noise generated by the torpedo's own propulsion system, has a large effect on the sensitive hydrophones of the seeker head. Sophisticated methods of suppressing self-noise, such as narrowband beamforming, were not sophisticated enough at the time; thus, it was logical to suppress propulsion noise in general, with low performance being the trade-off.

Specifications:

Mark XI

- Prototype date: 1943
- Entered service: 1944
- Propulsion: Lead-acid battery
- Weight: 3,632 lb (1,647 kg)
- Length: 22 ft 5 in (6.83 m)
- Explosive charge: 710 lb (320 kg) TNT
- Range and speed: 5,500 yd (5,000 m) at 28 kn (52 km/h) (preheated), 4,500–5,000 yd (4,100–4,600 m) at 28 kn (52 km/h) (cold)
- Notes: Produced in small numbers and never used against live targets during the war.

== Mark 12 ==
A design for a high-speed torpedo propelled by high-test peroxide (HTP), based on wartime research by Hellmuth Walter during the Second World War. At first codenamed "Ferry", then "Fancy", the Mark 12 never moved past the prototype stage. The design was conceived in 1945, after the end of the war in Europe, with the arrival of technical documentation from Germany. For economical reasons, the Mark VIII torpedo body was used, in an effort to adapt it to HTP propulsion. The "Ferry" was supposed to be a surface-running torpedo with a gyroscopically guided search pattern. Prototypes of the weapon were ready in 1953, except for the pattern-running feature, which was then omitted and the weapon was redesignated as "Fancy". In 1954, several prototypes were issued to HMS Maidstone and over 200 test runs were carried out until a catastrophic accident. On 16 June 1955, HMS Sidon was alongside HMS Maidstone in Portland Harbor, preparing to make way to Stage II trials of the "Fancy". Crewmen on the submarine were in the process of loading one of the prototype torpedoes into a launch tube, when the stop valve on the weapon was accidentally opened, triggering the release of reactant in its propulsion unit. The weapon exploded inside the launch tube, simultaneously blowing out the bow caps as well as the rear hatch of the launch tube. A blast of debris and dense carbon dioxide were propelled into the submarine. Two officers and ten seamen were killed instantly, six from the initial blast and six more by asphyxiation from the ejected gases. One more victim, a doctor from the Maidstone, subsequently perished in an effort to rescue the crew from the submarine. The submarine sank in shallow water due to flooding from the blown-open launch tube. Ultimately the accident caused enough damage to have the submarine taken permanently out of service. Following this accident, a second Mark 12 Fancy exploded at the Arrochar torpedo range in Loch Long, Scotland. As a consequence of these accidents, and the perceived hazardous nature of HTP propulsion, the program was cancelled in 1959.

Specifications:

Mark 12

- Prototype date: 1952
- Weight: 3,452 lb (1,566 kg)
- Length: 254.5 in (6.46 m)
- Explosive charge: 750 lb (340 kg) Torpex
- Range and speed: Unknown, above 40 kn (74 km/h)

== Mark 20 Bidder ==
21-inch Mark 20
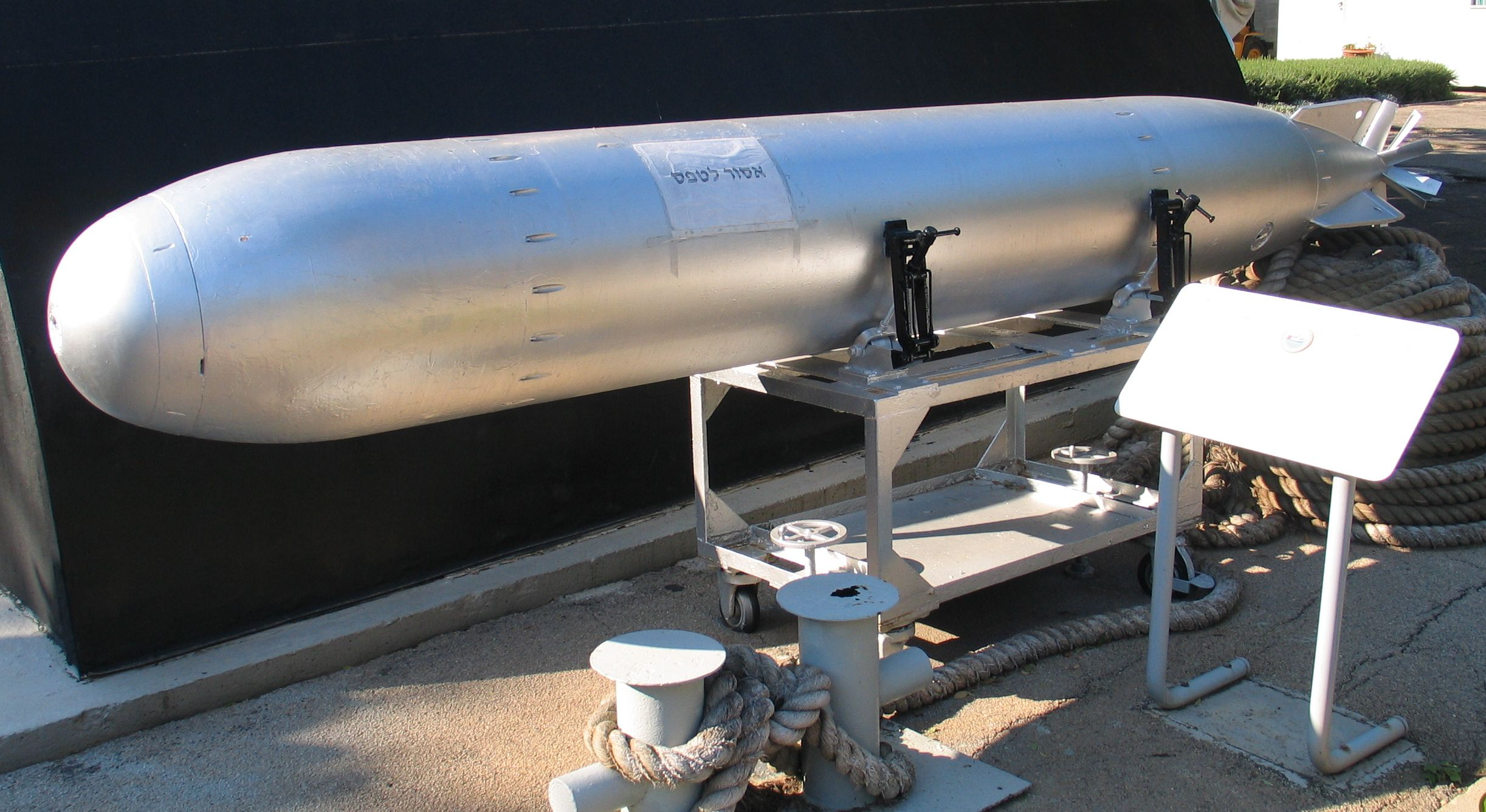
- A Mark 20 torpedo exhibit at the Clandestine Immigration and Naval Museum, Haifa, Israel.
- Type: Torpedo
- Place of origin: United Kingdom

Service history
- In service: 1955–1988
- Used by: RN

Production history
- Designed: 1945

Specifications
- Mass: 1,810 lb (820 kg)
- Length: 13.5 ft (4.11 m)
- Diameter: 21 in (530 mm)
- Warhead: Torpex
- Warhead weight: 196 lb (89 kg)
- Engine: Electric
- Propellant: Battery (perchloric acid)
- Operational range: 12,000 yd (11,000 m) (Mark 20S), 7,200 yd (6,600 m) (Mark 20C), 14,000 yd (13,000 m) (Mark 20I)
- Maximum depth: 800 ft (240 m) (Mark 20S, 20C)
- Maximum speed: 20 kn (37 km/h)
- Guidance system: Passive sonar

The Mark 20 was a passive-seeker battery-powered torpedo which was initially conceived in 1945, as a 21-inch development of the 18-inch "Dealer" project for a parachute-dropped ASW weapon, conceived in 1943. At the end of the Second World War the "Dealer" project was renamed "Dealer A" and became further branched out into the 21-inch "Bidder" and 18-inch "Dealer B" projects. Thus, the Mark 20 was developed alongside the 18-inch Mark 30 Dealer B and shared elements of its design. The development program was elevated in scope and priority after the cancellation of the Mark 21 Pentane. Two variants were developed: the Mark 20S ("Submarine") for use by submarines, and a larger Mark 20E ("Escort") for use by surface ships. The E variant had a length of 21.2 ft (6.46 m). The S variant had a single speed of 20 knots, and the E variant had a dual-speed mode of 15 knots and 24 knots, for target search and subsequent autonomously switched attack run. In the E configuration, the torpedo was designed to have a total endurance of 20,000 yd (18,000 m) at the 15 knot speed, and 6,000 yd (5,500 m) upon switching to the 24 knot speed. A total of 75 units of the Mark 20E were produced, with trial samples being distributed to the Type 12, Type 14, and Type 15 classes of frigates. As of 1958, the E variant was still not ready for service due to problems with its programming, and the prospect of a medium-range ASW torpedo being carried by the upcoming Westland Wasp helicopter was deemed more desirable. The deficient speed of the Mark 20 was also a motivating factor. As a result, the E variant project was eliminated, leaving only the S variant. This led to several of the frigates that were intended to have used them (Rothesay and Whitby classes) never being fitted with torpedo tubes or having them removed. As of 1959, the only destroyer class projected to carry the Mark 20 was the Leander, but as of 1963, this design consideration would also be eliminated. The final version of the Mark 20 Bidder was referred to as the Mark 20 Improved. The Mark 20 Improved entered service in 1971, originally developed by Vickers Shipbuilding and Engineering as an export version. It featured weight reductions to its synchromechanisms and the contra-rotating propeller gearing, and the earlier mechanical course and depth setting devices were replaced by electronic ones, receiving data from the launch console via an umbilical link. These improvements, together with new batteries common to the Mark 23, slightly increased torpedo endurance.

A third variant, Mark 20C ("Combined") was designed following the failure of the Mark 20E. This was an alternate version of the S configuration, fitted with the same warhead, using elements of the E project in an effort to make a marginally faster weapon for both ASW and ASuW. Like the Mark 20S, the weapon had a single speed setting. The Mark 20C was ready for service in 1963 and administratively accepted in 1973, with units already deployed in the field throughout the 1960s. The C configuration had a mass of 1,799 lb (816 kg) and the same body as the S configuration; as of 1961, the performance was a speed of 23 knots and an endurance of 7,000 yd (6,400 m), with later versions performing at 24 knots for 7,200 yd (6,600 m). The Mark 20 was evaluated at the Arrochar torpedo range during a time period spanning from 1956 until 1966. The staff requirement for the Mark 20S was TASW 118 (June 1950), and the staff requirement for the Mark 20C was USW 357 (February 1961).

The Mark 20S and 20C variants had a maximal homing depth of 800 ft (240 m). When configured for surface vessel attack, the running depth setting range was 10–210 ft (3–64 m). The Mark 20 Improved, sharing multiple components with the Mark 23, was likely capable of depth in excess of 1,000 ft (300 m), judging from tests of the latter carried out in 1973.

Prompted by the tactical needs of the Indonesia–Malaysia confrontation, in 1965, Captain John Moore of the Royal Navy developed a variant of the Mark 20 which he dubbed "Archimedes". This was an underwater, submarine-launched, equipment delivery vehicle designed to support clandestine operations, particularly those of the frogmen of the Special Boat Service. The warhead was removed and replaced with a sealed cargo capsule. Like other such vehicles of the type, the "Archimedes" could beach itself in a controlled manner, allowing frogmen or other clandestine agents to open the capsule and retrieve its contents. The vehicle could also be directly piloted by a frogman, with variable speeds, functioning as an underwater tug and diver propulsion vehicle. The aft structure housed two hinged cling bars, manually deployable after launch from a torpedo tube, which could accommodate a pair of divers - one on either side of the vehicle. A protective tubular cage extended over and beyond the vehicle's screws, physically keeping the operators and towed equipment from harm and serving as a partial propwash duct. The prototype of the "Archimedes" was a larger Mark 23 torpedo, but the series-production version utilized a Mark 20 body. Captain John Moore was quoted as referring to the Mark 20 as "a useless device for its original task".

The Mark 20 was the only torpedo in service which could fit the short stern launch tubes of the Oberon and Porpoise-class submarines. It remained in the submarine service until 1988, which is when the Porpoise class were retired. Following experience in the 1982 Falklands War, when an armed Mark 20 became stuck inside its tube and HMS Onyx was forced to return to Portsmouth to have it removed, the Oberon class would relegate the stern launch tubes for storing beer, retiring the Mark 20 sooner.

== Mark 21 Pentane ==
A project for an autonomous active sonar ASW torpedo to be carried by the Avro Lancaster, Avro Shackleton, Short Sturgeon and Fairey Gannet aircraft in an anti-submarine role, originally conceived in 1947. Development commenced in 1949, and a final design was selected in 1954, delivering functional prototypes with a speed of 30 knots and an endurance of 12000 yards. By this time several of the aircraft capable of carrying a 21-inch torpedo were in the process of being withdrawn from service. Following the 1957 Defence White Paper, which de-emphasized the role of aircraft carriers, the RAF Coastal Command was left as the sole operator and the project was cancelled in 1958 due to cost considerations and an assessment that the weapon lacked the speed to counter upcoming nuclear submarine designs. The seeker head development was transferred to Project Ongar, which would later become the Mark 24 Tigerfish.

== Mark 22 Mackle ==
A wire-guided version of the Mark 20 separately developed by Vickers Shipbuilding and Engineering (VSEL) as a private venture. Development commenced in 1950. The project was completed in 1952, delivering what was essentially a Mark 20 torpedo with one-way COLOS three-dimensional wire guidance. With no signals being transmitted back from the moving weapon through the guidance wire, tracking of both the target and the weapon had to be accomplished via the launching submarine's sonar. Weapon performance was reduced to a speed of 18 knots due to the extra hardware and the trailing wire. The project was cancelled in 1956, but the wire guidance technology was transferred to the Mark 20 Bidder, contributing to the development of the Mark 23 Grog.

== Mark 23 Grog ==
21-inch Mark 23
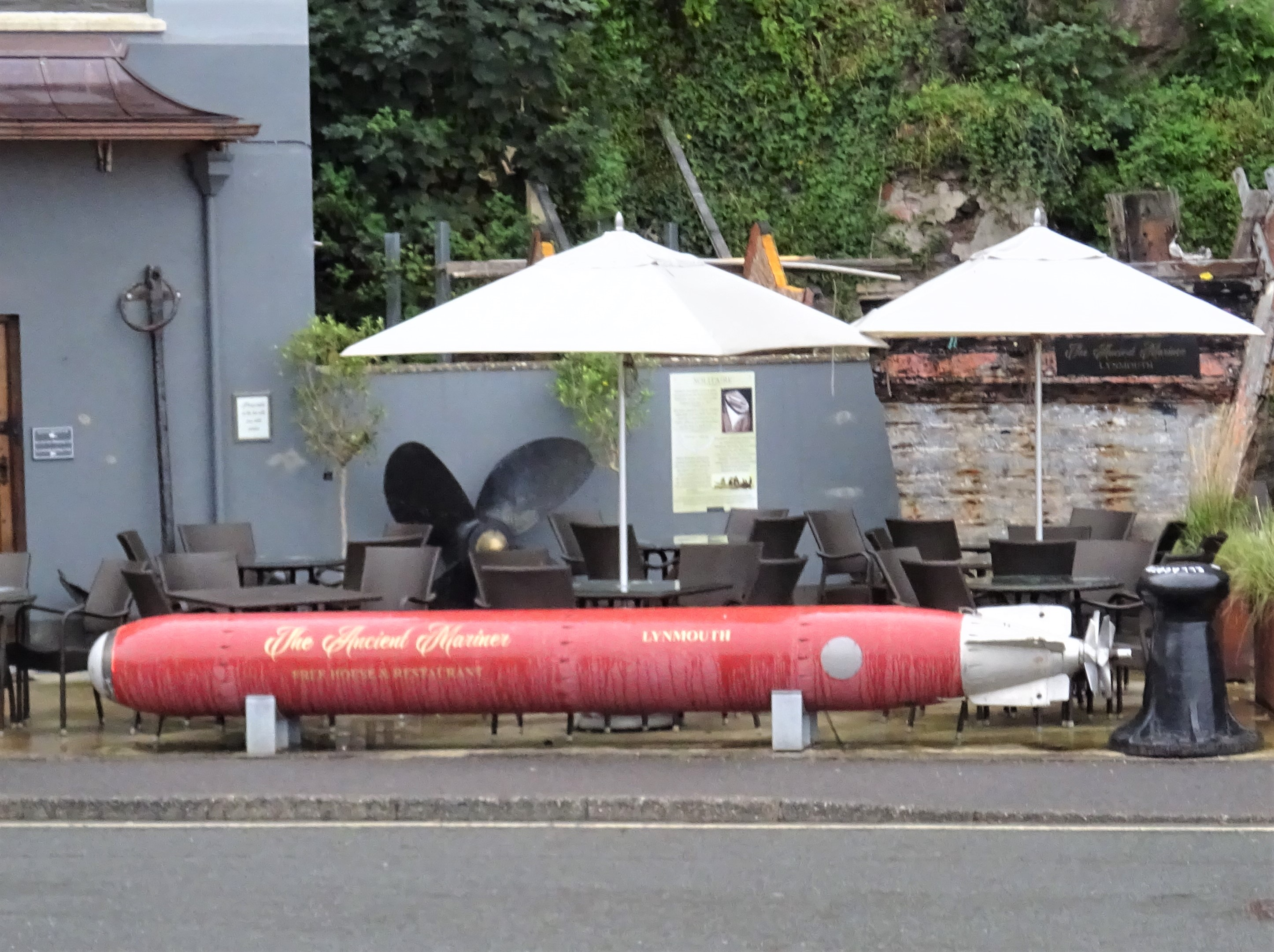
- A Mark 23 torpedo repainted as an advertisement in front of The Ancient Mariner restaurant in Lynmouth, United Kingdom.
- Type: Torpedo
- Place of origin: United Kingdom

Service history
- In service: 1966–1987
- Used by: RN

Production history
- Designed: 1956

Specifications
- Mass: 2,000 lb (907 kg)
- Length: 14.9 ft (4.54 m)
- Diameter: 21 in (530 mm)
- Warhead: Torpex
- Warhead weight: 196 lb (89 kg)
- Engine: Electric
- Propellant: Battery (perchloric acid)
- Operational range: 12,000 yd (11,000 m) low-speed, 8,900 yd (8,100 m) high-speed
- Maximum speed: 20 kn (37 km/h) low-speed, 28 kn (52 km/h) high-speed
- Guidance system: Passive sonar, Wire guided

A wire-guided version of the Mark 20 with a dual-speed mode, for target approach and attack run. Wire guidance had been worked on for the "Bidder" project from its inception, and the earliest prototypes of the "Grog" were available for testing in 1955. After the "Mackle" project was cancelled in 1956 the complex wire guidance system was transferred to the "Grog" program. This would be simplified, improved, and the first production units of the Mark 23 Grog were delivered in 1959. The earliest production version of the Mark 23 was broadly identical to the Mark 22 "Mackle", having a single speed of 18 knots and a test depth of 800 ft (240 m). The Mark 23 was fitted with a 10,000 m (11,000 yd) outboard dispenser that contained a control wire to guide the weapon. Wire guidance was optional, with the control wire spool being a separate module which remained inside the launch tube. An operator on board the submarine would listen to the torpedo's hydrophones, guiding the weapon past decoys and countermeasures. The first submarines to receive the Mark 23, in its preliminary 18-knot speed configuration, were the eight Triton class "Super-T" conversion boats which were made available between 1951 and 1956. This meant that the weapon was fielded in some form since 1959, long before its official adoption. Entered service in 1966 although already obsolescent, considering the common speeds of nuclear-propelled submarines of the era. The Mark 23 was evaluated at the Arrochar torpedo range during a time period spanning from 1959 until 1969. According to one report, the weapon did not become fully operational until 1971, and served until 1987, which is when all stocks of the Mark 24 Tigerfish were converted to Mod 2.

The robustness of the Mark 23 was tested by HMS Dreadnought, Britain's inaugural nuclear submarine (SSN). Launches of various torpedoes were attempted at different speeds. It was noted that the outboard dispenser of the Mark 23 would not tolerate a submarine speed of more than 6 knots while reeling out the guidance wire. By contrast, the Mark VIII would launch successfully at speeds of up to 18 knots, taking minor damage from collisions with the bow fairing at speeds above that; a speed of 15 knots was considered reliably safe. The Dreadnought was ultimately successful in launching the Mark VIII at speeds of up to 21 knots. During testing in 1973, on HMS Swiftsure, the Mark 23 was successfully launched from a depth of 1,000 ft (300 m); however, in one of these tests, the control wire spool - a component designed to stay inside the tube until the control wire was severed - did not disconnect from the launch tube, with the wire left trailing outside. Consequently, the bow caps could not close and the tube was rendered inoperable until the obstruction could be cleared at the surface.

During the trials phase of the Mark 23, in 1965, Captain John Moore of the Royal Navy experimented with a sample of the torpedo body. Royal Navy engineers aboard the submarine depot ship HMS Medway (former HMS LCT 1109) modified the torpedo body to his specifications, into a human torpedo prototype, with the primary function of an underwater tug. Supplementary batteries were added, increasing the vehicle's range. Ultimately the Mark 20 torpedo body would be selected for a similar vehicle, which went into series production.

During 1973 all of the RN torpedoes had to be taken out of service as the control system was failing at extreme range. After months of investigation it was discovered that the fault lay in the Guidance Unit made by GEC. A germanium diode in the automatic gain control (AGC) circuit had been replaced by a silicon diode, following an instruction by RN stores that all germanium diodes had to be replaced by more modern silicon diodes. The silicon diode's different characteristics caused the AGC circuit to fail. Once the mistake was found, replacing the diode with the original type cured the problem.

== Mark 24 Tigerfish ==
The Mark 24 Tigerfish was a high-speed, long-range, wire-guided torpedo originally developed under Project Ongar, named after the Ongar station of the London Underground. The staff requirement for this weapon was written in 1959 and the weapon was expected to enter service in the mid-1960s, with an in-service target date of 1969. The planned speed was 55 knots, with the final product having a dual-speed mode of 24 and 35 knots. The original version of the weapon (Mod 0) had a never-exceed depth of 1,200 ft (370 m), well short of the test depth of multiple contemporary Soviet submarines, and a minimal depth setting which made it incapable of targeting surface vessels. Between 1960 and 1974, the weapon was known by its project codename "Ongar", with various test launches taking place at the Arrochar torpedo range, spanning from 1960 to 1976. Initial production rounds were delivered in 1974, and a production order was made in 1977. Affected by the budgetary constraints of the 1966 Defence White Paper, the Mark 24 Tigerfish (Mod 1) officially entered service in 1983, after tentative field deployment of both Mod 0 and Mod 1 during previous years. All variants of the Tigerfish were removed from service in 2004.

The Mark 24 Tigerfish had a protracted development program, beginning with the initial two models, then studies to tackle its deficiencies, and finally a Marconi Consolidation Program (nicknamed "Get Well") undertaken in the late 1980s to convert existing units to the Mod 2 standard.

- Mark 24 Mod 0 Tigerfish (1974)
- Mark 24 Mod 1 Tigerfish (1978)
- Mark 24(N) Tigerfish (nuclear payload variant, paper study only)
- Mark 24 Mod 2 Tigerfish (1987)
- Mark 24 Mod 3 Tigerfish (simplified inexpensive version, paper study only)

Despite the highly problematic development program of the Tigerfish, Britain would repeatedly decline American offers of the Mark 48. As an example, in February 1980, the United States would offer Britain a free coproduction license for the Mark 48, together with classified new manufacturing processes, and contracts for £150 million worth of purchases of the torpedo thus manufactured. This too was declined.

== Spearfish ==
Much more capable than Tigerfish. Deployed from 1992, and replacing all Tigerfish by 2004.

== See also ==
- British 18-inch torpedo
- List of torpedoes
