= Ralf-Reimar Wolfram =

German naval officer (1912–1945)

- Korvettenkapitän Ralf-Reimar Wolfram
- Born: 31 March 1912; Wilhelmshaven, Province of Hanover, Kingdom of Prussia, German Empire
- Died: 9 February 1945 (aged 32); U-864, Norwegian Sea
- Military career
- Allegiance: Nazi Germany
- Branch: Kriegsmarine
- Rank: Korvettenkapitän
- Commands: U-108; U-864
- Conflicts: World War II; Action of 9 February 1945 †

Ralf-Reimar Wolfram (31 March 1912 – 9 February 1945) was a Korvettenkapitän (lieutenant commander) during World War II. During his career he commanded two U-boats for a total of 118 days at sea spanning four patrols. During his third patrol he sank the SS Robert Gray, an American liberty ship. Robert Gray was a straggler from convoy HX 234 en route to Britain.

For Wolfram's fourth patrol, he commanded U-864 during Operation Caesar. He was killed when U-864 was sunk by the British submarine Venturer. This was the only known instance of one submerged submarine sinking another submerged submarine. U-864 remains Wolfram's grave to this day.

== Bibliography ==
- Busch, Rainer; Röll, Hans-Joachim (1999b). German U-boat commanders of World War II : a biographical dictionary. Translated by Brooks, Geoffrey. London, Annapolis, Md: Greenhill Books, Naval Institute Press. ISBN 1-55750-186-6.
