= Operation Caesar =

German World War II naval operation

Coordinates: 60°46′10″N 4°37′15″E

- Part of The Second World War
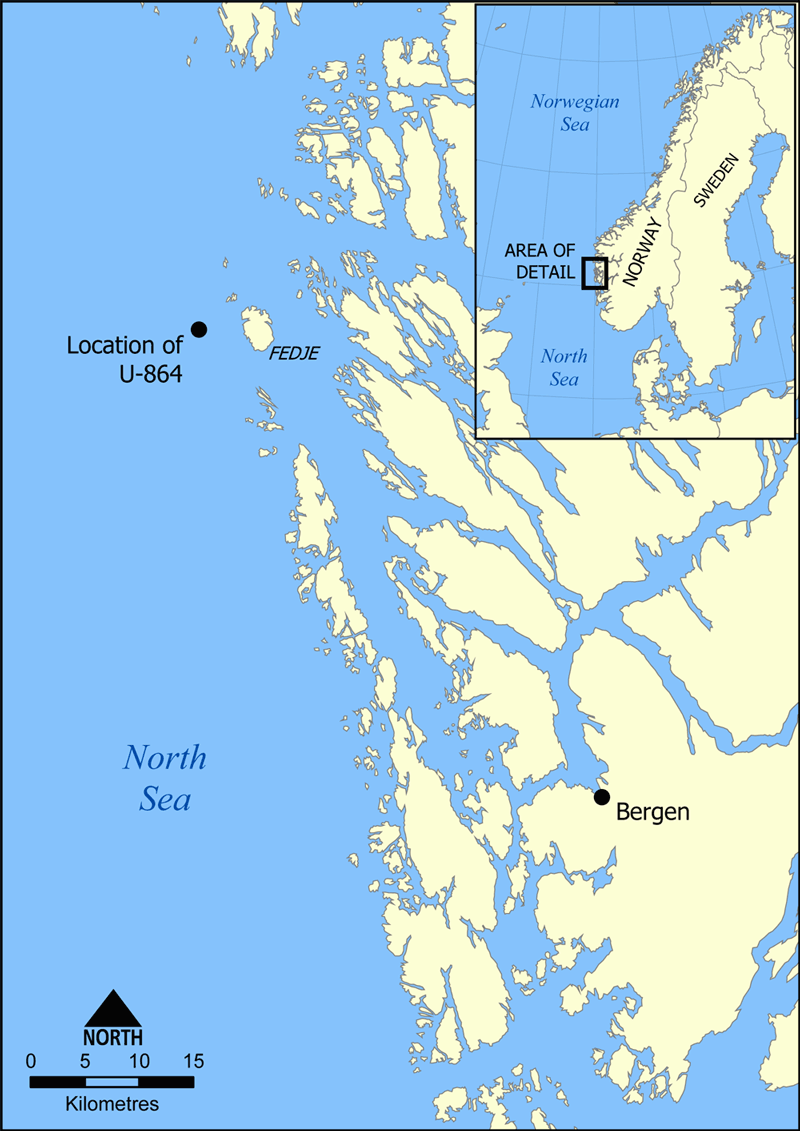
- Location of U-864
Date	5 December 1944 – 9 February 1945
Location	North Sea near Vestland, Norway
Result	British victory

Belligerents
(Nazi Germany) Germany	United Kingdom

Commanders and leaders
Ralf-Reimar Wolfram †	Jimmy Launders

Strength
U-864	HMS Venturer

Casualties and losses
U-864 sunk; 73 crew and passengers killed	None

Operation Caesar (Unternehmen Kaiser) was a secret mission carried out by Germany in the Second World War to supply Japan with advanced technology. The operation failed due to the sinking of U-864 by a British submarine, the only known example of a submerged submarine sinking another submerged submarine.

== The operation ==
On 5 December 1944, U-864, on her maiden voyage, was dispatched on a secret mission to deliver supplies to Japan. U-864's primary cargo was advanced Messerschmitt jet engine parts for use in Japanese aircraft and V-2 missile guidance systems. Her secondary cargo comprised 64 long tons (65 t) of the strategic material mercury in 1,857 canisters for use in weapons production.

She left Kiel and headed north. While going through the Kiel Canal, U-864 grounded and damaged her hull. Her captain, Ralf-Reimar Wolfram, decided to sail to the U-boat pens at Bergen, Norway. On 12 January 1945, while U-864 was still undergoing repairs, British bombers attacked the pens, delaying the repairs further. The repairs were completed in early February and Wolfram embarked on his mission once again. British code breakers at Bletchley Park deciphered Enigma encoded transmissions and were alerted to U-864's mission. To counter the German U-boat, the Admiralty diverted the submarine HMS Venturer (Lieutenant James Launders), which had just left Lerwick in Scotland, to Fedje Island, off the coast of Norway to search for U-864.

== Action of 9 February 1945 ==
On 6 February 1945, U-864 experienced trouble with one of her engines, which began misfiring, greatly increasing the sounds the U-boat made. Wolfram contacted Bergen, informing them that he would be returning for further repairs. Wolfram was told that an escort would be waiting for them at Hellisøy on 10 February. At the same time, Venturer arrived off Fedje Island and began searching for the U-boat. On 9 February, Venturer's hydrophone operator detected a noise that sounded like a diesel engine. Launders raised periscope and surveyed the horizon, he spotted what he believed to be another periscope (in fact now thought to be the U-boat's snorkel) and began stalking it, assuming that it was U-864.

As Venturer followed the German U-boat, it became apparent that they knew they had been spotted due to the erratic, zigzag course U-864 began to take. After following the German submarine for three more hours, Venturer's crew made a calculated decision based on U-864's movements. At intervals of 17.4 seconds, Venturer fired all four of her torpedoes. Hearing the incoming torpedoes, U-864 took evasive manoeuvres, avoiding the first three torpedoes but unknowingly steered into the path of the fourth. The torpedo struck the U-boat, splitting her in half and sending her to the ocean floor. All 73 of her crew and passengers perished.

== Aftermath ==
=== Analysis ===
The operation was a failure for the Germans. Had it not been for the damage the U-boat sustained or the British bombing of Bergen, U-864 would have had a month's lead on Venturer by the time the Enigma code was broken and she was dispatched, which would have made a significant difference to the outcome.

=== Casualties ===
The Germans lost U-864 and all 73 of her crew, including her captain, Ralf-Reimar Wolfram. The British suffered no casualties or damage. For his actions at Fedje, Lieutenant Launders received the Distinguished Service Order.

=== Subsequent events ===
After coming across documents listing mercury as one of the cargoes on board U-864, the Royal Norwegian Navy began searching for the wreckage. After searching for five years, the U-boat was found in October 2003 by the mine control vessel HNoMS Tyr, 4 km (2.2 nmi; 2.5 mi) off Fedje. After examining the site for two years, it became apparent that the mercury was indeed leaking into the ocean at increasing rates every year. Due to the hazards of mercury, fishing is now prohibited in the region. One study recommended entombing the wreck under a layer of sand, gravel and concrete. The Norwegian government instead awarded a contract to a salvage company to raise the wreck but the proposed operation was postponed pending additional studies.

The Norwegian government spent 15 years assessing possible risks of raising the wreck, with its dangerous unexploded torpedoes inside. Finally, in February 2017, it was decided to cover the U-864 with 50 centimetres of sand and 160,000 long tons (160,000 t) of rock to seal the mercury inside the wreck.
