= Marine mercury pollution =

Mercury contamination in sea and sediments

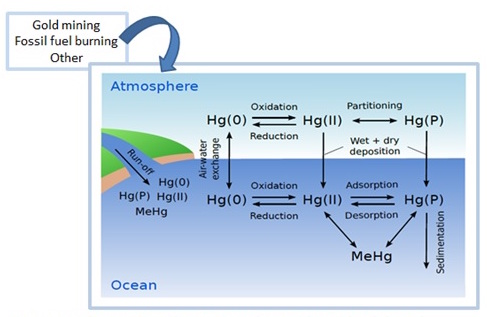
Sources and chemistry of mercury pollution in the ocean

Mercury is a heavy metal that cycles through the atmosphere, water, and soil in various forms to different parts of the world. Due to this natural mercury cycle, irrespective of which part of the world releases mercury it could affect an entirely different part of the world making mercury pollution a global concern. Mercury pollution is now identified as a global problem and awareness has been raised on an international action plan to minimize anthropogenic mercury emissions and clean up mercury pollution. The 2002 Global Mercury Assessment concluded that "International actions to address the global mercury problem should not be delayed". Among many environments that are under the impact of mercury pollution, the ocean is one which cannot be neglected as it has the ability to act as a "storage closet" for mercury. According to a recent model study the total anthropogenic mercury released into the ocean is estimated to be around 80,000 to 45,000 metric tons and two-thirds of this amount is estimated to be found in waters shallower than 1000m level where much consumable fish live. Mercury can bioaccumulate in marine food chains in the form of highly toxic methylmercury which can cause health risks to human seafood consumers. According to statistics, about 66% of global fish consumption comes from the ocean. Therefore, it is important to monitor and regulate oceanic mercury levels to prevent more and more mercury from reaching the human population through seafood consumption.

== Sources ==
Mercury release occurs through both natural and anthropogenic processes. Natural processes are mainly geogenic such as volcanic activities and land emissions through the soil. Volcanoes release mercury from the underground reservoirs upon eruption. Land emissions are usually observed in regions closer to plate-tectonic boundaries where soils are enriched with minerals such as cinnabar (insoluble mercury sulfide, HgS). This mercury is released, usually as a salt, either by natural weathering of the rocks or by geothermal reactions. While natural phenomena account for a certain percentage of present-day emissions, anthropogenic emissions alone have increased mercury concentration in the environment by threefold. Global Mercury Assessment 2013 states main anthropogenic sources of mercury emission are artisanal and small-scale gold mining, fossil fuel burning, and primary production of non-ferrous metals. Other sources such as cement production, consumer product waste, crematoria, contaminated sites, and the chloralkali industry also contribute in relatively small percentages.

Mercury enters the ocean in different ways. Atmospheric deposition is the largest source of mercury in the oceans. Atmospheric deposition introduces three types of mercury to the ocean. Gaseous elemental mercury (Hg0) enters the ocean through air-water exchange. Inorganic mercury (Hg2+/HgII) and particle-bound mercury (Hg(P)) enter through wet and dry deposition. In addition, mercury enters the ocean via rivers, estuaries, sediments, hydrothermal vents, etc. These sources also release organic mercury compounds such as methylmercury. Once they are in the ocean they can undergo many reactions primarily grouped as; redox reactions (gain or loss of electrons), adsorption processes (binding to solid particles), methylation, and demethylation (addition or removal of a methyl group).

=== Sedimentary mercury ===
Mercury can enter seas and the open ocean as a result of the down stream movement and re-deposition of contaminated sediments from urban estuaries. For example, high total Hg content up to 5 mg/kg and averaging about 2 mg/kg occur in the surface sediments and sediment cores of the tidal River Mersey, UK, due to discharge from historical industries located along the banks of the tidal river including industries such as historical chlor-alkali industry. Sediments along a 100 km stretch of the Thames Estuary have also been shown to have total Hg contents of up to 12 mg/kg and a mean of 2 mg/kg with the highest concentrations found at depth in and around London. A gradual and statistically significant decrease in sedimentary Hg content occurs in the Thames as a results of greater distance from the historical and current point-sources, sorption and in-river deposition in the mud reaches, as well as dilution by marine sands from the Southern North Sea. In contrast, sediments entering the ocean from the marsh creeks of east coast US and mangroves fringing the South China Sea generally have moderate sedimentary Hg (<0.5 mg/kg).

=== Submarines ===
Many tonnes of liquid mercury reside in steel cylinders in the keels of sunken submarines around the world. Some have begun to leak and create environmental problems, for example German submarine U-864, sunk in 1945 near the coast of Norway, containing 67 tonnes of mercury.

== Chemistry ==
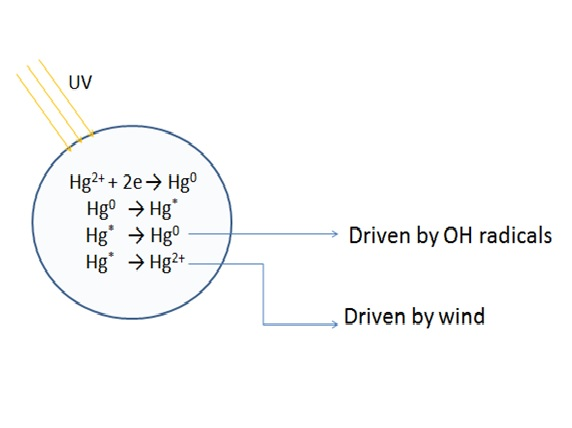
Photochemistry of mercury on oceanic aerosols

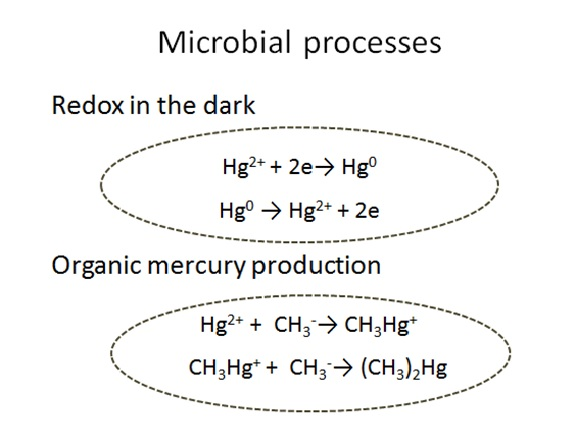
Microbial chemical conversions of mercury

Reduction and oxidation of mercury mostly occur closer to the ocean water surface. These are either driven by sunlight or by microbial activity. Under UV radiation, elemental mercury oxidizes and dissolves directly in ocean water or binds to other particles. The reverse reaction reduces some mercury Hg2+ to elemental mercury Hg(0) and returns to the atmosphere. Fine aerosols in the atmosphere such as ocean water droplets can act as small reaction chambers in this process providing the special reaction conditions required. Oxidation and reduction of mercury in the ocean are not very simple reversible reactions. Shown below is the proposed pathway of ocean aerosol mercuric photochemistry suggesting that it occurs through a reactive intermediate:

Photo oxidation is suspected to be driven by OH. radicals and reduction is driven by wind and surface layer disturbances. In the dark, mercury redox reactions continue due to microbial activity. The biological transformations are different and have a smaller rate compared to sunlight-driven processes above. Inorganic mercury Hg2+ and methylmercury have the ability to get adsorbed into particles. A positive correlation of binding is observed for the amount of organic matter vs. the concentration of these mercury species showing that most of them bind to organic matter. This phenomenon can determine the bioavailability and toxicity of mercury in the ocean. Some methylmercury is released into the ocean through river run-off. However, most of the methylmercury found in the ocean is produced in–situ (inside the ocean itself). Methylation of inorganic mercury can occur via biotic and abiotic pathways. However, biotic pathways are more predominant. The reactions illustrated in a simplified scheme below are actually parts of complex enzyme-driven metabolic pathways taking place inside microbial cells.

In abiotic reactions, humic substances act as methylating agents and therefore this process occurs at shallow sea levels where decomposing organic matter is available to combine with inorganic mercury Hg2+.9 Mercury methylation studies in polar regions have also shown a positive correlation between methylation and chlorophyll content in water showing there could also be biogenic pathways for methylmercury production. Produced methylmercury gets accumulated in microbes. Due to the high permeability and absence of degradation for methylmercury in other species that depend on those microbes, this very toxic compound gets biomagnified through marine food chains to the top predators. Many humans consume many types of marine fish that are top predators in the food chains, putting their health in great danger. Therefore, finding possible solutions to minimize further mercury emissions and clean up the already existing mercury pollution is extremely important.

== Health risks ==
Oceanic mercury pollution presents a serious threat to human health. The United States Environmental Protection Agency (EPA) states that mercury consumption by people of all ages can result in loss of peripheral vision, weakened muscles, impairment of hearing and speech, and deteriorated movement coordination. Infants and developing children face even more serious health risks because mercury exposure inhibits proper brain and nervous system development, damaging memory, cognitive thinking, language abilities, attention, and fine motor skills. The case of Minamata disease that occurred in Minamata Bay, Japan in the 1950s demonstrated the frightening effects of exposure to extremely high concentrations of mercury. Adult patients experienced extreme salivation, limb deformity, and irreversible dysarthria and intelligence loss. In children and fetuses (exposed to mercury through the mother's consumption of contaminated seafood), extensive brain lesions were observed and the patients experienced more serious effects like cerebral palsy, mental retardation, and primitive reflexes. In order to avoid the toxic effects of mercury exposure, the United States EPA advises a mercury dose limit of 0.1 μg/kg/day.

In addition to human health, animal health is also seriously threatened by mercury pollution in the ocean. The effects of high mercury levels on animal health were revealed by the severe mercury poisoning in Minamata Bay in which many animals exhibited extremely strange behaviors and high mortality rates after consuming contaminated seafood or absorbing mercury from the seawater. The cat population essentially disappeared due to cats drowning in the ocean and simply collapsing dead and it became commonplace to witness birds falling out of the sky and fish swimming in circles.

== Prevention and remedy ==
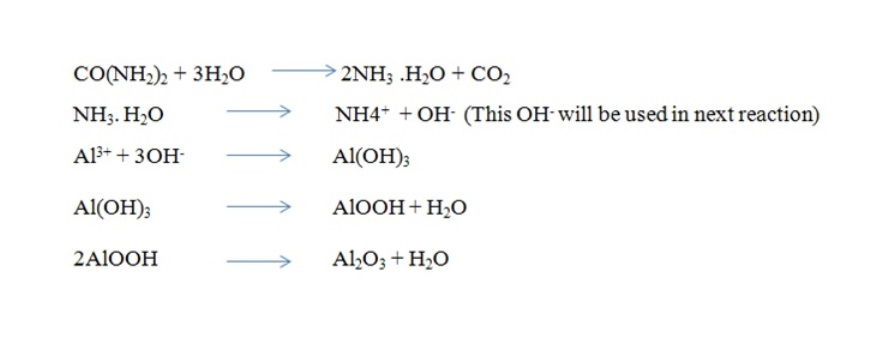
Synthetic corals

Cleaning up the existing mercury pollution could be a tedious process. Nevertheless, there is some promising ongoing research bringing hope to the challenging task. One such research is based on nanotechnology. It uses synthesized aluminum oxide nanoparticles (Al2O3) mimicking the coral structures. These structures absorb heavy metal toxins effectively due to the high surface/volume ratio and the quality of the surface. In nature, it has been long observed corals can absorb heavy metal ions due to their surface structure and this new technique has been used in nanotechnology to create "synthetic corals" which may help clean mercury in the ocean.

Another novel material (Patent application: PCT/US15/55205) is still under investigation which looks at the possibility of cleaning mercury pollution using orange peels as raw material. This technology produces sulfur limonene polysulfide (proposed material) using sulfur and limonene. Using industrial byproducts to manufacture this polymer makes it a highly sustainable approach. The scientists say 50% of the mercury content could be reduced with a single treatment using this polymer.

In addition to the cleaning processes, minimizing the usage of coal power and shifting to cleaner energy sources, reducing small-scale artisanal gold mining, proper treatment of industrial mercury waste, and implementation policies are sound approaches to reduce mercury emissions in the long term-large scale plan. Public awareness is critical in achieving this goal. Proper disposal of mercury-containing items such as medicinal packaging and thermometers, using mercury-free bulbs and batteries, and buying consumer products with zero or minimum mercury emission to the environment can make a significant difference in recovering the world's ecosystems from mercury pollution leaving a minimum legacy of mercury pollution in the ocean for our future generations.

== See also ==
- Dimethylmercury
- Ethylmercury
- Methylmercury
- Mercury (element)
- Mercury cycle
- Mercury in fish
- Mercury poisoning
