= HMS Venturer (P68) =

WWII V-class submarine operated by the Royal Navy

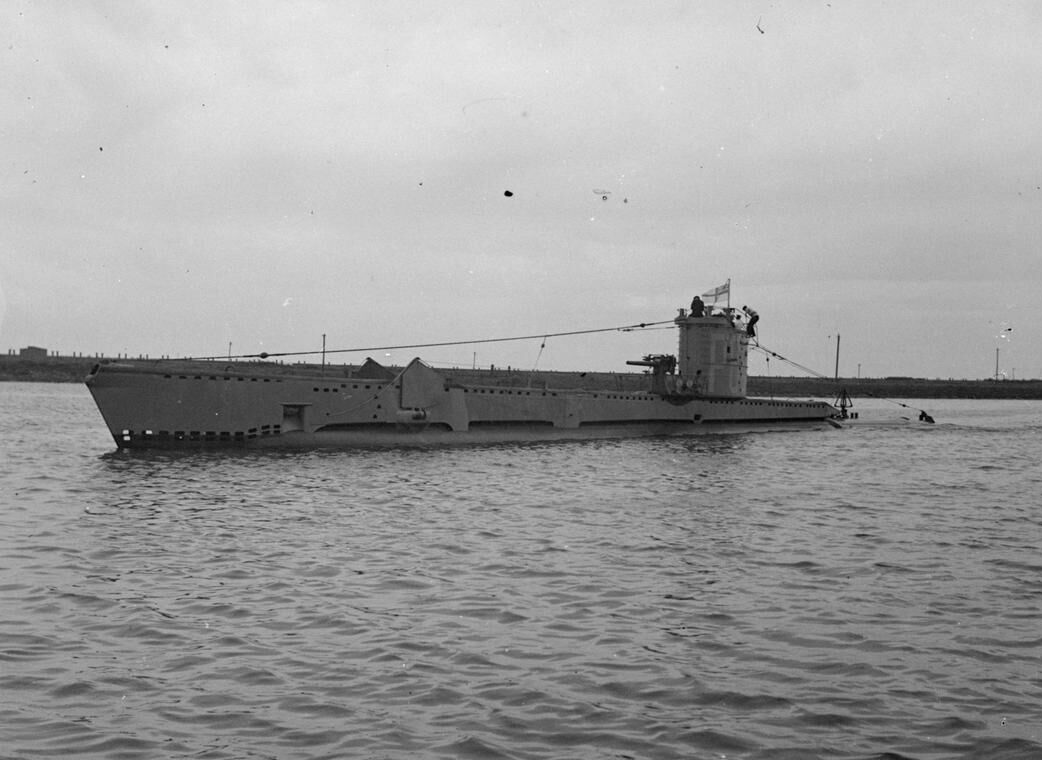
- HMS Venturer (P68)

History

United Kingdom
- Name: HMS Venturer
- Builder: Vickers Armstrong, Barrow-in-Furness
- Laid down: 25 August 1942
- Launched: 4 May 1943
- Commissioned: 19 August 1943
- Decommissioned: 1946
- Identification: Pennant number P68
- Fate: Sold to Norway, 1946

Norway
- Name: HNoMS Utstein
- Acquired: 1946
- Stricken: January 1964
- Fate: Broken up

General characteristics
- Class & type: V-class submarine
- Displacement: 545 tons surfaced; 740 tons submerged
- Length: 206 ft (63 m)
- Speed: 11.25 knots (20.84 km/h; 12.95 mph) surfaced; 10 knots (19 km/h; 12 mph) submerged
- Test depth: 300 ft (91 m)
- Complement: 37
- Armament: 4 × 21 inch (533 mm) bow torpedo tubes and 8 torpedoes; 1 × 3 in (76 mm) deck gun; 3 × .303 calibre machine guns for anti-aircraft defence

HMS Venturer was a Second World War British submarine of the V class that sank two German U-boats and five merchant ships during the war. Following the war, the boat was sold to Norway and was renamed HNoMS Utstein. She was scrapped in 1964.

She is the only submarine in history to have sunk another while both were submerged.

== Construction ==
Venturer was the lead boat of the British V-class submarine, a development of the successful U class. She was built at the Vickers Armstrong yard in Barrow-in-Furness. Construction commenced in August 1942 and she was launched eight months later in May 1943. Venturer was commissioned on 19 August 1943.

== Service history ==
On completing trials and working-up, Venturer commenced operations patrolling the Norwegian coast for coastal traffic and U-boats leaving or entering base.

She was successful on several occasions, sinking three Axis vessels during 1944.

She also sank the German submarine U-771 on 11 November 1944 7 nautical miles (13 km) east of Andenes, Norway, off the Lofoten Islands.

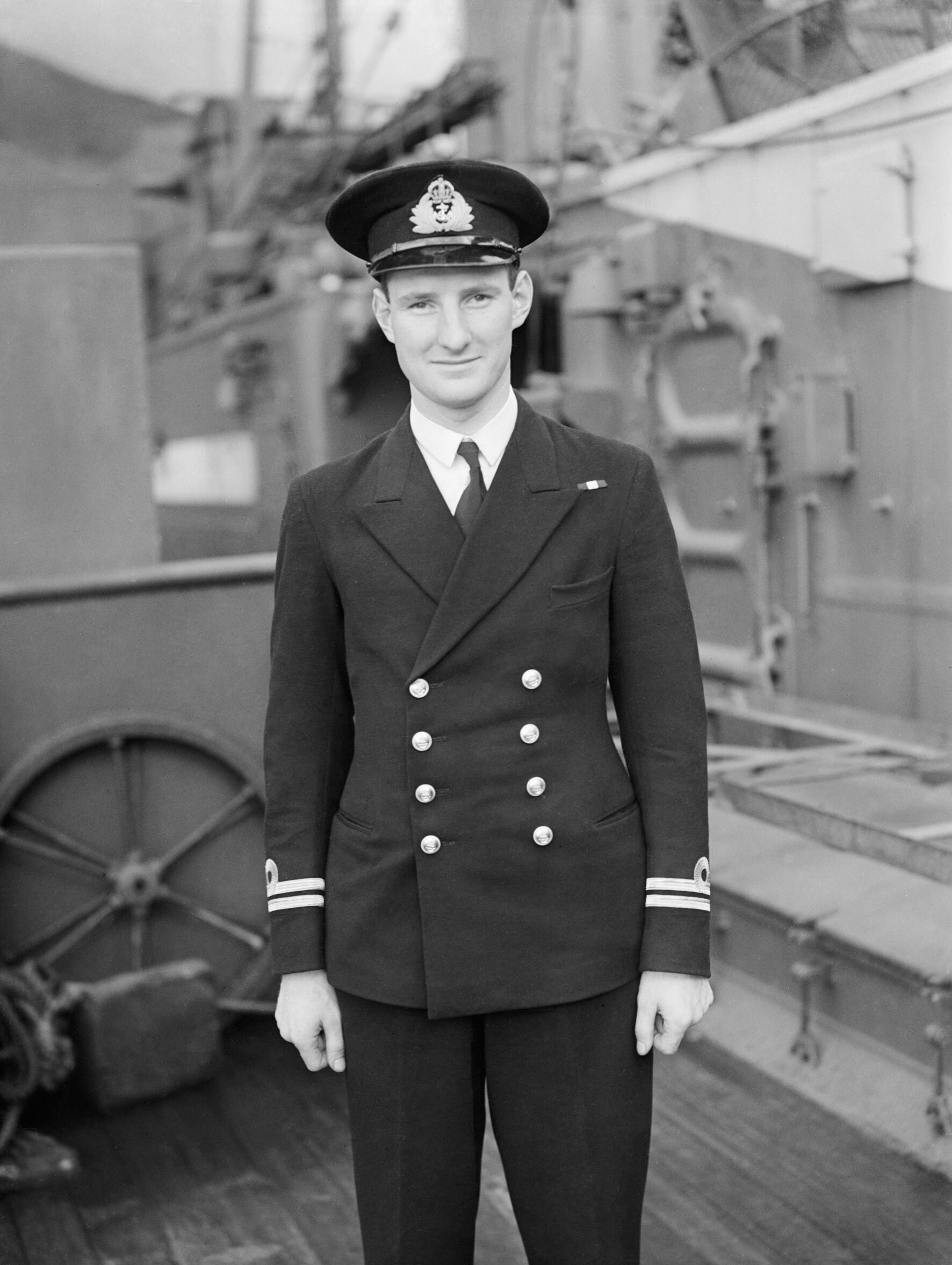
Lt J S Launders DSC RN, on commissioning of Venturer at Holy Loch, 20 August 1943 (IWM A18834)

Her most famous mission, however, was her eleventh patrol out of the British submarine base at Lerwick in the Shetland Islands, under the command of 25-year-old Jimmy Launders, which included the first time in the history of naval warfare that one submarine intentionally sank another while both were submerged.

Sent to the Fedje area, Venturer was then ordered on the basis of Enigma decrypts to seek, intercept and destroy U-864 which was in the area. U-864 was carrying a cargo of 65 tonnes of mercury as well as Junkers Jumo 004B jet engine parts (used in the Messerschmitt Me 262) to Japan, a mission code-named Operation Caesar.

=== Action of 9 February 1945 ===
On 6 February 1945, U-864 passed through the Fedje area without being detected, but on 9 February Venturer heard U-864's engine noise. Launders had decided not to use ASDIC since it would betray his position and spotted the U-boat's periscope as her captain looked for his escort. In an unusually long engagement for a submarine, and in a situation for which neither crew had been trained, Launders waited 45 minutes after first contact before going to action stations. Launders was waiting for U-864 to surface and thus present an easier target. Upon realising they were being followed by the British submarine and that their escort had still not arrived, U-864 zig-zagged underwater in attempted evasive manoeuvres, with each submarine occasionally risking raising her periscope.

Venturer had eight torpedoes. U-864 could carry up to 22 torpedoes but due to the nature of the trip (transport to Japan) she did only hold 4 torpedoes at time of action. After three hours Launders decided to make a prediction of U-864's zig-zag and released a spread of his torpedoes into its predicted course. This manual computation of a firing solution against a three-dimensionally manoeuvring target was the first occasion on which techniques were used and became the basis of modern computer-based torpedo targeting systems. Prior to this attack, no target had been sunk by torpedo where the firing ship had to consider the target's position in three-dimensional terms, where the depth of the target was variable and not a fixed value. The computation thus differs fundamentally from those performed by analogue torpedo fire-control computers which regarded the target in strictly 2D terms with a constant depth determined by the target's draught.

The torpedoes were released in 17-second intervals beginning at 12:12, and all taking four minutes to reach their target. Launders then dived Venturer suddenly to evade any retaliation. U-864 heard the torpedoes coming, dived deeper, and turned away to avoid them. The first three torpedoes were avoided, but U-864 unknowingly steered into the path of the fourth. Exploding, U-864 split in two, and sank with all hands coming to rest more than 150 metres (490 ft) below the surface. Launders was awarded a bar to his DSO for this action.

=== Merchant ships sunk ===
During her career, she sank five merchant ships all off the Norwegian coast.

Date	Name	Nationality	Tonnage (Note: Merchant ship tonnages are in gross register tons. Military vessels are listed by tons displacement.)	Location
2 Mar 1944	Thor	Germany	5559	Stadlandet
15 Apr 1944	Friedrichshafen	Germany	1923	Egersund
11 Sep 1944	Vang	Norway	678	Lister
22 Jan 1945	Stockholm	Germany	618	Stavanger
19 Mar 1945	Sirius	Germany	1,350	Namsos

== Post-war ==
With the end of hostilities Venturer was destined for disposal. In 1946 she was sold to the Royal Norwegian Navy, and was renamed Utstein. She served with the Norwegians until January 1964, when she was struck from the Royal Norwegian Navy register. After her removal from naval service, the submarine was sold to a scrapyard and broken up.
