= German submarine U-864 =

World War II German Submarines

History

Nazi Germany
- Name: U-864
- Ordered: 5 June 1941
- Builder: DeSchiMAG AG Weser, Bremen
- Yard number: 1070
- Laid down: 15 October 1942
- Launched: 12 August 1943
- Commissioned: 9 December 1943
- Fate: Sunk on 9 February 1945

General characteristics
- Class & type: Type IXD2 submarine
- Displacement: 1,610 t (1,580 long tons) surfaced; 1,799 t (1,771 long tons) submerged
- Length: 87.58 m (287 ft 4 in) o/a; 68.5 m (224 ft 9 in) pressure hull
- Beam: 7.50 m (24 ft 7 in) o/a; 4.40 m (14 ft 5 in) pressure hull
- Height: 10.20 m (33 ft 6 in)
- Draught: 5.35 m (17 ft 7 in)
- Propulsion: 9,000 PS (8,900 shp; 6,600 kW) surfaced; 1,000 PS (990 shp; 740 kW) submerged
- Speed: 20.8 kn (38.5 km/h; 23.9 mph) surfaced; 6.9 kn (12.8 km/h; 7.9 mph) submerged
- Range: 12,750 nmi (23,610 km; 14,670 mi) at 10 kn (19 km/h; 12 mph) surfaced; 57 nmi (106 km; 66 mi) at 4 kn (7.4 km/h; 4.6 mph) submerged
- Test depth: Calculated crush depth: 230 m (754 ft 7 in)
- Boats & landing craft carried: 2 dinghies
- Complement: 55–63 officers & ratings
- Armament: 6 × torpedo tubes (four bow, two stern); 24 × 53.3 cm (21 in) torpedoes; 1 × 10.5 cm (4.1 in) SK C/32 deck gun (150 rounds); 1 × 3.7 cm (1.5 in) Flak M42 AA gun; 2 × twin 2 cm (0.79 in) C/30 anti-aircraft guns

Service record
- Part of: 4th U-boat Flotilla; 9 December 1943 – 31 October 1944; 33rd U-boat Flotilla; 1 November 1944 – 9 February 1945
- Identification codes: M 54 842
- Commanders: K.Kapt. Ralf-Reimar Wolfram; 9 December 1943 – 9 February 1945
- Operations: 1 patrol: 7 – 9 February 1945
- Victories: None

German submarine U-864 was a Type IXD2 U-boat of Nazi Germany's Kriegsmarine in World War II. On 9 February 1945, she became the only submarine in history to be sunk by an enemy submarine while both were submerged. U-864 was sunk by the British submarine HMS Venturer, and all 73 men on board died.

== Design ==
German Type IXD2 submarines were considerably larger than the original Type IXs. U-864 had a displacement of 1,610 t (1,580 long tons) when at the surface and 1,799 t (1,771 long tons) while submerged. The U-boat had a total length of 87.58 m (287 ft 4 in), a pressure hull length of 68.50 m (224 ft 9 in), a beam of 7.49 m (24 ft 7 in), a height of 10.21 m (33 ft 6 in), and a draught of 5.35 m (17 ft 7 in). The submarine was powered by two MAN M 9 V 40/46 supercharged four-stroke, nine-cylinder diesel engines plus two MWM RS34.5S six-cylinder four-stroke diesel engines for cruising, producing a total of 9,000 PS (6,620 kW; 8,880 shp) for use while surfaced, two Siemens-Schuckert 2 GU 345/34 double-acting electric motors producing a total of 1,000 shp (1,010 PS; 750 kW) for use while submerged. She had two shafts and two 1.85 m (6 ft) propellers. The boat was capable of operating at depths of up to 200 m (660 ft).

The submarine had a maximum surface speed of 20.8 kn (38.5 km/h; 23.9 mph) and a maximum submerged speed of 6.9 kn (12.8 km/h; 7.9 mph). When submerged, the boat could operate for 121 nmi (224 km; 139 mi) at 2 kn (3.7 km/h; 2.3 mph); when surfaced, she could travel 12,750 nmi (23,610 km; 14,670 mi) at 10 kn (19 km/h; 12 mph). U-864 was fitted with six 53.3 cm (21 in) torpedo tubes (four fitted at the bow and two at the stern), 24 torpedoes, one 10.5 cm (4.13 in) SK C/32 naval gun, 150 rounds, and a 3.7 cm (1.5 in) Flak M42 with 2575 rounds as well as two twin 2 cm (0.79 in) C/30 anti-aircraft guns with 8100 rounds. The boat had a complement of fifty-five.

== Service history ==
=== Early career ===
Commanded throughout her entire career by Korvettenkapitän Ralf-Reimar Wolfram, she served with the 4th U-boat Flotilla undergoing crew training from her commissioning until 31 October 1944. She was then reassigned to the 33rd U-boat Flotilla.

=== Final voyage ===
According to decrypted intercepts of German naval communications with Japan, U-864's mission was to transport military equipment to Japan destined for the Japanese military industry, a mission code-named Operation Caesar. The cargo included approximately 67 short tons (61 t) of metallic mercury in 1,857 32 kg (71 lb) steel flasks stored in her keel. That the mercury was contained in steel canisters was confirmed when one of the canisters containing mercury was located and brought to the surface during surveys of her wreck in 2005. Approximately 1,500 short tons (1,400 t) of mercury was purchased by the Japanese from Italy between 1942 and Italy's surrender in September 1943. This had the highest priority for submarine shipment to Japan and was used in the manufacture of explosives, especially primers.

There was some speculation as to whether U-864 was carrying uranium oxide, as was the U-234, which surrendered to the US Navy in the Atlantic on 15 May 1945, but Det Norske Veritas (DNV) concluded that there was no evidence that uranium oxide was on board U-864 when she departed Bergen. During the Norwegian Coastal Administration's investigation of the wreck of U-864 in 2005, radiation measurements were made but no traces of uranium oxide were found.

According to her cargo list, U-864 also carried parts and engineering drawings for German jet fighter aircraft and other military supplies for Japan, while among her passengers were Messerschmitt engineers Rolf von Chlingensperg and Riclef Schomerus, Japanese torpedo expert Tadao Yamoto, and Japanese fuel expert Toshio Nakai.

The U-864, commanded by Wolfram, left Kiel on 5 December 1944, arriving at Horten Naval Base, Norway four days later. Before leaving Germany, U-864 had been refitted with a snorkel mast. Several messages found in the Ultra archives show that there were problems with the snorkel, which needed repairs before the U-864 put to sea for her voyage to Japan. All Schnorkel trials and training were conducted at Horten near Oslo. U-864 would have needed to be certified ready to sail at Horten before proceeding to Bergen.

While en route to Bergen, U-864 ran aground and had to stop in Farsund for repairs, not arriving in Bergen until 5 January 1945. While docked in the Bruno U-boat pens, U-864 received minor damage on 12 January when the pens and shipping in the harbour were attacked by 32 Royal Air Force Lancaster bombers and one Mosquito bomber of 9 and 617 Squadrons. At least one Tallboy bomb penetrated the roof of the bunker causing severe damage inside, and left one of the seven pens unusable for the remainder of the war.

=== Sinking ===
After repairs and adjustments to her snorkel were completed, U-864 commenced submerged trials, but German radio transmissions regarding her whereabouts had been decrypted and British submarine HMS Venturer was sent from the British submarine base at Lerwick to intercept.

On 6 February, U-864 passed the Fedje area without being detected, but after one of her Diesel engines began to misfire, she was ordered to return to Bergen where an escort would be provided at Hellisøy. On 9 February, Venturer detected U-864's engine noise using her hydrophone as she was refraining from using active sonar (ASDIC) to avoid disclosing her position and later spotted the U-boat's snorkel.

In a long engagement and in a situation for which neither crew had been trained, Venturer waited 45 minutes after making contact before going to action stations. Recognising they were being followed and that their escort had still not arrived, U-864 began zig-zagging. After three hours, Venturer fired all four bow torpedo tubes at the U-boat's predicted position, beginning at 12:12, at 17-second intervals and at variable depths, then dived deeper to avoid retaliation. U-864 heard the torpedoes coming and also dived deeper and turned away. Evading the first three, she steered into the path of the fourth and imploded, split in two and sank with all hands, coming to rest in over 150 m (490 ft) of water, 2 nmi (3.7 km; 2.3 mi) west of Fedje.

The battle between U-864 and HMS Venturer was the subject of a highly fictionalized version in the comic book Le dernier secret d'Hitler (Hitler's Last Secret) by Mathieu Mariolle, Fabio Piacentini and Massimo Travaglini.

== Rediscovery ==
Wreck location

The wreck was located in March 2003 by the Royal Norwegian Navy two nautical miles (3.7 km; 2.3 mi) west of the island of Fedje in the North Sea, at 150 m (490 ft). The mercury had been seeping out of rusted containers, contaminating the region and sea life. One study recommended entombing the wreck under a layer of sand, gravel and concrete. The Norwegian government instead awarded a contract to a salvage company to raise the wreck; however, the proposed operation was delayed pending additional studies.

Royal Norwegian Navy minesweeper KNM Tyr, alerted by local fishermen, discovered the wreck. An expedition to gather more detail by sonar mapping of the seafloor was mounted in October 2003. The wreck was in two major sections, fore and aft, with the center section missing, including the conning tower. Further analysis was performed with a remotely operated underwater vehicle in August 2005, locating an additional 107 pieces of vessel debris in the area, likely parts of the exploded center section. The mercury, contained in 1,857 rusting steel bottles in the keel, was found to be leaking and poses a severe environmental threat of mercury poisoning.

Currently, four kilograms (9 lb) of mercury is leaking into the surrounding environment per year, resulting in high levels of contamination in cod, cusk and edible crab around the wreck. Boating and fishing near the wreck has been prohibited. Although attempts using robotic vehicles to dig into the half-buried keel were abandoned after the unstable wreck shifted, one steel bottle was recovered. Its original five-millimetre (0.20 in) thick wall was found to have corroded badly, leaving in places a one-millimetre (0.04 in) thickness of steel.

The 2,400-ton wreck's delicate condition, live torpedoes and rusting mercury bottles would make a lifting operation extremely dangerous, with significant potential for environmental catastrophe. A three-year study by the Norwegian Coastal Administration recommended entombing the wreck in a twelve-metre (40 ft) thickness of sand, with a reinforcing layer of gravel or concrete to prevent erosion. This is being proposed as a permanent solution, and the proposal notes similar techniques have been successfully used around 30 times to contain mercury-contaminated sites over the past 20 years.

== Environmental protection ==
The fragmented wreck contains 67 tonnes of toxic liquid mercury. Over time, toxic metal leakage has spread over an area of 30,000 square metres (7.4 acres).

The 2007 proposal to entomb the wreck rather than removing it was criticised by locals concerned about possible future leakage.

On 11 November 2008, the Norwegian Coastal Administration awarded the contract for the salvage of the U-864 submarine and her cargo of mercury to salvage company Mammoet Salvage BV. Mammoet, which had been awarded the salvage contract for the Russian nuclear submarine Kursk in 2001, proposed a method of raising U-864's wreck which would satisfy the environmental requirements, described as "a safe and innovative salvage solution". This was reported to be a safe, fully remotely controlled operation which would raise the submarine and remove the source of pollution without the need for anyone working under water. On 29 January 2009, the Norwegian government approved the proposed method of raising the wreck, and the operation was scheduled to begin in 2010. The operation was estimated to cost 1 billion kroner (US$153 million). However, the operation was postponed after the government asked for additional studies.

In the spring of 2016, the Norwegian Coastal Administration installed a counter fill on the slope under the bow section of U-864 in order to stabilize the seabed. The operation involved laying approximately 100 000 cubic meters of sand and rock in a controlled and precise manner from a specially designed ship. The result was reduced risk of movement by unconsolidated sediments, including contaminated materials, during seaquakes.

In October 2018 the Norwegian Coastal Administration decided that the wreck of U-864 would be entombed after all by capping her in clean fill on the seabed where she lay. Establishing that the counter fill in 2016 was a similar operation as capping, the government decided that capping could be carried out with proven technology and with minimum spreading of contaminated sediments. In 2024, authorities decided to retrieve the accessible parts of the mercury in 2026, before capping the rest.

== See also ==
- Mercury pollution in the ocean

== Bibliography ==
- Busch, Rainer; Röll, Hans-Joachim (1999). German U-boat commanders of World War II: A Biographical Dictionary. Translated by Brooks, Geoffrey. London, Annapolis, Md: Greenhill Books, Naval Institute Press. ISBN 1-55750-186-6.
- Busch, Rainer; Röll, Hans-Joachim (1999). Der U-Boot-Krieg, 1939–1945: Deutsche U-Boot-Verluste von September 1939 bis Mai 1945 [German U-boat losses from September 1939 to May 1945] (in German). Vol. IV. Hamburg, Berlin, Bonn: Mittler. ISBN 3-8132-0514-2.
- Gröner, Eric; Jung, Dieter; Maass, Martin (1991). German Warships 1815–1945: U-boats and Mine Warfare Vessels. Vol. 2. Translated by Thomas, Keith; Magowan, Rachel. London: Conway Maritime Press. ISBN 0-85177-593-4.
- Preisler, J.; Sewell, K. (2013) [2012]. Code-Name Caesar: The Secret Hunt for U-boat 864 during World War II (repr. Souvenir Press, London ed.). New York: Berkley Books. ISBN 978-0-285-64203-4.
