= Mercury methylation =

Chemical reaction

Mercury methylation is the process of forming methylmercury (MeHg). The methylation of mercury can occur abiotically or biotically. Biotically, the primary methylators of mercury are sulfate-reducing and iron-reducing bacteria. Three mechanisms have been proposed for the biotic methylation of mercury by sulfate-reducing bacteria. Sulfate-reducing bacteria, iron-reducing bacteria, and methanogens are observed to be responsible for the formation of methylmercury in anoxic waters and sediments. They are commonly detected as the main methylators in anaerobic environments. On the other hand, recent studies have shown that methylation of mercury can also occur in oxic waters through the same pathways (hgcAB gene pair).

Mercury methylation can be problematic as methylmercury is toxic and can be bio-magnified and bioaccumulated through the food web.

== Chemistry ==
Chemical elements on Earth cycle through atmospheric, terrestrial, and aquatic environments in a process called biogeochemical cycling. Mercury goes through its own version of biogeochemical cycling named the mercury cycle where it circulates through the environment and changes between oxidation states: Hg(0), Hg(I), Hg(II). When mercury is present in the environment microbial organisms can uptake the elemental form of mercury. This signals the transcription of the genes hgcA and hgcB are transcribed to synthesize the HgcA and HgcB proteins. These proteins can then start the methylation reaction to form methylmercury.

=== Biochemical ===
==== Microbial ====
Species from all three domains of life have been found to play a role in the methylation of mercury. More species have been discovered that genetically are capable of mercury methylation due to the discovery of the hgcAB genes. It is not known if the HgcA and HgcB proteins create a multienzyme complex or work sequentially. It has also been shown that deletion of either gene results in the complete loss of the ability to methylate mercury.

Bacterial species currently known to methylate mercury include the major of Desulfovibrio spp. (i.e. Desulfovibrio desulfuricans). and Geobacter spp. (i.e. Geobacter sulfurreducens) Other species with the hgcAB genes that suspected to produce MeHg include Bacteroidota, Chloroflexota, and Nitrospirota.

Archaeal species known to methylate mercury include the majority of species of methanogen class Methanomicrobia, however, class Thermoplasmata has been found to carry the hgcAB genes. No other species of methanogens have been found with the ability of mercury methylation.

==== Selenoproteins ====
In bacteria, a large majority of HgcA proteins are actually selenoproteins, with a previously unrecognized N-terminal extension region that includes a CU (cysteine-selenocysteine) dipeptide motif. A minority of HgcB proteins also are selenoproteins.

==== Reactions ====
pH influences on mercury methylation can be variable depending on the species that are undergoing the reactions. Some findings demonstrate that an increase in the hydrogen ion concentration resulted in large increases of the Hg(II) uptake, leading to potential impacts on the actual methylation of mercury. Another finding demonstrated that the decrease in pH leads to a shift in the production of methyl mercury species. Specifically, the production of dimethylmercury decreases and the production of monomethylmercury increases, but total remains essentially constant.

Enough adequate studies on the temperature influences on the methylation of mercury have not been published. Mercury methylation reaches maximum activity in the summer but this enhanced methylation may be due to other factors unrelated to temperature. However, it is evident that temperature affects microbial activity which will correspond to an impact on the subsequent biochemical reactions that lead to methylation of mercury.

Similar to the pH effects, different concentrations of available mercury ion lead to different products and complexes of mercury being produced. In addition, the enzymes HgcA and HgcB have a very low Km and will therefore readily bind to the available mercury even at very low concentrations.

Recent studies have found out that increased concentration of terrestrial dissolved organic matter (tDOM), due to increased runoffs (one of climate change consequences particularly observed in the Northern Hemisphere), leads to an increase in the bacterial production and activity, ultimately increasing the process of methylation of mercury. A number of studies have reported positive correlations between concentrations of methymercury and organic matter in surface and intermediate marine waters, which have been attributed to the microbial decomposition of settling particles where micro-anoxic environments are created, allowing anaerobic Hg methylators (e.g., iron–sulfur reducing bacteria and methanogens) to be active.

==== Transport into cell ====
Before mercury can be methylated, it must be transported into the cell through the lipid membrane. Mercury ions are bound by a mercury scavenger protein, MerP. MerP transfers the mercury ion to a cytoplasmic membrane transporter, MerT, then to the active site of mercuric reductase or mercury(II) reductase in the cytoplasm.

Normally mercury would be toxic to the cell, but some microorganisms are resistant to mercury ion due to an inducible mer operon. Translation of the operon results in the synthesis of mercuric reductase. Mercuric reductase will reduce the mercury ion into elemental mercury, which is volatilized from the cell. If mercuric reductase is not employed, methylation of mercury can occur via three identified pathways.

==== Biochemical pathway ====
Cultures of sulfate reducing bacteria grown without the presence of sulfate will not methylate mercury. It is a possibility that the respiration of these cells is coupled to mercury methylation.

The Acetyl-CoA pathway for mercury methylation is done by sulfate reducing bacteria and is catalyzed by a corrinoid dependent protein. Through this pathway, the methyl group is proposed to originate from C-3 serine. A transfer of the methyl group from CH3-Tetrahydrofolate to the corrinoid protein requires the genes hgcA and hgcB. The methyl group now on the corrinoid protein will then be transferred to mercury ion. This activity was shown to decrease in aerobic environments, suggesting that the methylation occurs anaerobically.

Acetate Metabolic pathway (methyl-transferase enzymes) is very similar to the acetyl CoA pathway, where methyltransferase enzymes involving tetrahydrofolate intermediates are utilized. It was shown that methylation of mercury was greater by three orders of magnitude in cells that were capable of utilizing acetate.

Methylation of mercury can also occur using a cobalamin dependent methionine synthase. The cobalamin dependent process requires the use of the substrate S-adenosylmethionine, a biological methylating agent. As methionine synthase was used, it is possible that the enzyme that methylates mercury is also able to transfer methyl groups from CH3-Tetrahydrofolate to thiols.

=== Environmental impact ===
==== Animal health ====
Methyl mercury is a toxic substance to living organisms. The toxicity of methylmercury in humans is due to methyl mercury crossing the blood-brain barrier and causing cell lysis in the central nervous system. The cell damage is irreversible. The half-life of methylmercury in human tissue is 70 days, which allows it ample time to accumulate to toxic levels. Humans are exposed to methyl mercury from the consumption of aquatic species. As mercury bioaccumulates through the food chain, the amount of methyl mercury increases to these toxic levels.

== See also ==
- Mercury poisoning
