= Alkylmercury lyase =

alkylmercury lyase
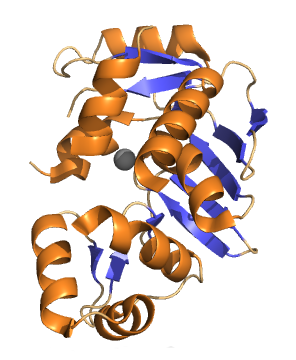
- Structure of the mercury-bound form of E.coli MerB. PDB 3f0p

Identifiers
- EC no.: 4.99.1.2
- CAS no.: 72560-99-7

Databases
- IntEnz: IntEnz view
- BRENDA: BRENDA entry
- ExPASy: NiceZyme view
- KEGG: KEGG entry
- MetaCyc: metabolic pathway
- PRIAM: profile
- PDB structures: RCSB PDB PDBe PDBsum
- Gene Ontology: AmiGO / QuickGO
Search
- PMC: articles
- PubMed: articles
- NCBI: proteins

The enzyme alkylmercury lyase (EC 4.99.1.2) catalyzes the reaction

an alkylmercury + H^{+} $\rightleftharpoons$ an alkane + Hg^{2+}

This enzyme belongs to the family of lyases, specifically the "catch-all" class of lyases that do not fit into any other sub-class. The systematic name of this enzyme class is alkylmercury mercury(II)-lyase (alkane-forming). Other names in common use include organomercury lyase, organomercurial lyase, and alkylmercury mercuric-lyase.

The enzyme converts methyl mercury to the much less toxic elemental form of the metal.
