= Diethylmercury =

Names
- IUPAC name diethylmercury

Identifiers
CAS Number	627-44-1
3D model (JSmol)	Interactive image
Abbreviations	DEM; Et_{2}Hg
ChemSpider	11814
ECHA InfoCard	100.010.001
EC Number	211-000-7
MeSH	C007378
PubChem CID	12318
UNII	323TG9BTE8
CompTox Dashboard (EPA)	DTXSID1060841
- InChI: InChI=1S/2C2H5.Hg/c2*1-2;/h2*1H2,2H3; Key: SPIUPAOJDZNUJH-UHFFFAOYSA-N; InChI=1/2C2H5.Hg/c2*1-2;/h2*1H2,2H3;/rC4H10Hg/c1-3-5-4-2/h3-4H2,1-2H3 Key: SPIUPAOJDZNUJH-KFYQOLPSAK
- SMILES: CC[Hg]CC

Properties
Chemical formula	C_{4}H_{10}Hg (C_{2}H_{5})_{2}Hg
Molar mass	258.716 g·mol^{−1}
Appearance	Colorless liquid
Odor	Sweet
Density	2.446 g/ml
Melting point	−45 °C (−49 °F; 228 K)
Boiling point	156 to 157 °C (313 to 315 °F; 429 to 430 K)
Solubility in water	Insoluble
Solubility	Ethers, hydrocarbons, THF

Hazards
- Occupational safety and health (OHS/OSH)
Main hazards	Flammable, extremely toxic
- GHS labelling
Pictograms	(GHS06: Toxic) (GHS08: Health hazard) (GHS09: Environmental hazard)
Signal word	Danger
Hazard statements	H225, H300+H310+H330, H373, H410
Precautionary statements	P260, P262, P264, P270, P271, P273, P280, P284, P301+P310, P302+P350, P304+P340, P310, P314, P320, P321, P330, P361, P363, P391, P403+P233, P405, P501
Flash point	N/A
- Except where otherwise noted, data are given for materials in their standard state (at 25 °C [77 °F], 100 kPa). verify (what is ?) Infobox references

Diethylmercury is a flammable, colorless liquid, and one of the strongest known neurotoxins. This organomercury compound is described as having a slightly sweet smell, though inhaling enough fumes to notice this would be deadly. This chemical can cross the blood–brain barrier, causing permanent brain damage. It is, however, considerably less toxic than dimethylmercury.

The resulting (CH_{3}CH_{2})_{2}Hg is a dense liquid (2.466 g/cm^{3}) that boils at 58 °C at 16 torr. This extremely toxic compound is slightly soluble in ethanol and soluble in ether.

== Synthesis ==
Diethylmercury can be obtained from the reaction between ethylmagnesium bromide and mercury(II) chloride.

2 C_{2}H_{5}MgBr + HgCl_{2} → Hg(C_{2}H_{5})_{2} + MgBr_{2} + MgCl_{2}

Other methods are also known.

== See also ==
- Ethylmercury
- Mercury poisoning
