= Karen Wetterhahn =

American chemist (1948–1997)

- Born: October 16, 1948; Plattsburgh, New York, U.S.
- Died: June 8, 1997 (aged 48); Lebanon, New Hampshire, U.S.
- Other name: Karen Wetterhahn Jennette
- Education: St. Lawrence University; Columbia University (PhD)
- Known for: Work on toxic metal exposure; Death from Dimethylmercury exposure
- Scientific career
- Fields: Chemistry
- Workplaces: Dartmouth College
- Thesis: Metallointercalation reagents: synthesis, physical properties, and their interaction with nucleic acids (1975)
- Doctoral advisor: Stephen J. Lippard

Karen Elizabeth Wetterhahn (October 16, 1948 – June 8, 1997), also known as Karen Wetterhahn Jennette, was an American professor of chemistry at Dartmouth College in Hanover, New Hampshire, who specialized in toxic metal exposure. She died of mercury poisoning at the age of 48 due to accidental exposure to the extremely toxic organic mercury compound dimethylmercury (Hg(CH_{3})_{2}). Protective gloves in use at the time of the incident provided insufficient protection, and exposure to only one or two drops of the dimethylmercury absorbed through the gloves proved to be fatal after less than a year.

== Career ==
Wetterhahn was born in Plattsburgh, New York. She earned her bachelor's degree from St. Lawrence University in 1970 and her PhD from Columbia University in 1975. Her doctoral work was supervised by Stephen J. Lippard. She joined Dartmouth's faculty in 1976 as their first female chemistry professor and published more than 85 research papers. In 1990, Wetterhahn helped establish Dartmouth College's Women in Science Project (WISP), which helped to raise the share of women science majors from 13 to 25 percent at Dartmouth College and has become a national model.

== Research ==
Wetterhahn's research primarily focused on the toxic effects of metals on living organisms, with particular interest in hexavalent chromium.

== Accident and death ==
On August 14, 1996, Wetterhahn, a specialist in toxic metal exposure, was studying how mercury ions interact with DNA repair proteins and investigating the toxic properties of another highly toxic heavy metal, cadmium. She was using dimethylmercury, at the time the standard internal reference for ^{199}Hg nuclear magnetic resonance (NMR) measurements.

Wetterhahn later recalled that she had spilled several drops of dimethylmercury from the tip of a pipette onto her latex-gloved hand. Not believing herself in any immediate danger, as she was taking all recommended precautions, she proceeded to clean up the area prior to removing her protective clothing. However, tests later revealed that dimethylmercury can, in fact, rapidly permeate several kinds of latex gloves and enter the skin within about 15 seconds. Her exposure was later confirmed by hair analysis, which showed a dramatic jump in mercury levels 17 days after the initial accident, peaking at 39 days, followed by a gradual decline.

Approximately three months after the initial accident, Wetterhahn began experiencing brief episodes of abdominal discomfort and noticed significant weight loss. The more distinctive neurological symptoms of mercury poisoning, including loss of balance and slurred speech, appeared in January 1997, five months after the accident. At that point, tests proved that she had severe mercury poisoning. Her blood and urinary mercury content were measured at 4,000 μg/L and 234 μg/L, respectively—both many times their respective toxic thresholds of 200 μg/L and 50 μg/L (blood and urine reference ranges are 1 to 8 μg/L and 1 to 5 μg/L).

Despite aggressive chelation therapy, her condition rapidly deteriorated. Three weeks after the first neurological symptoms appeared, Wetterhahn lapsed into what appeared to be a vegetative state punctuated by periods of extreme agitation. One of her former students said, "Her husband saw tears rolling down her face. I asked if she was in pain. The doctors said it didn't appear that her brain could even register pain." Wetterhahn was removed from life support and pronounced dead on June 8, 1997, ten months after her initial exposure.

The case proved that the standard precautions at the time, all of which Wetterhahn had carefully followed, were inadequate for "super-toxic" chemicals like dimethylmercury. In response, the Occupational Safety and Health Administration (OSHA) recommended that the use of dimethylmercury be avoided unless absolutely necessary and mandated the use of plastic-laminate gloves when handling this compound. Her death prompted consideration of using an alternative reference material for mercury NMR spectroscopy experiments.

== Legacy ==
Wetterhahn's accidental exposure occurred despite her having taken all measures required at that time. These included the use of latex gloves, a fume hood, and adherence to standard safety procedures. After Wetterhahn's mercury poisoning was discovered, her colleagues tested various safety gloves against dimethylmercury and found that the small, apolar molecule diffuses through most of them in seconds, much more quickly than expected. As a result, it is now recommended by OSHA to wear laminate gloves, which should be worn under an outer glove that is resistant to abrasion and tears, while handling dimethylmercury.

At the time, dimethylmercury was the common calibration standard for ^{199}Hg NMR spectroscopy because it has certain advantages over other alternatives. As a consequence of Wetterhahn's accident, safety recommendations have been revised, and the use of dimethylmercury for any purpose has been highly discouraged. Wetterhahn's legacy includes a significant and lasting improvement in laboratory safety.

Dartmouth College has since established an award in Wetterhahn's name (The Karen E. Wetterhahn Graduate Fellowship in Chemistry, created in 1998 and funded by the Karen E. Wetterhahn Memorial Fund) to encourage other women to pursue careers in science. It is a one-year fellowship given to an exceptionally good chemistry graduate student who will receive their PhD within two years. Whenever possible, a woman is preferred for the award. The National Institute of Environmental Health Sciences also maintains the Karen Wetterhahn Memorial Award, awarded annually to a graduate student or post-doctoral researcher.
