= Mercury(II) reductase =

Class of enzymes

mercury (II) reductase
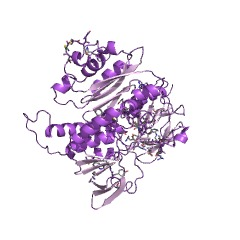

Identifiers
- EC no.: 1.16.1.1
- CAS no.: 67880-93-7

Databases
- BRENDA: enzyme data
- ExPASy: NiceZyme view
- KEGG: enzyme entry
- MetaCyc: metabolic pathway
- Rhea: reactions
- PDB structures: RCSB PDB PDBe PDBsum
- Gene Ontology: AmiGO / QuickGO
Search
- PMC: articles
- PubMed: articles
- NCBI: proteins

Mercury(II) reductase (EC 1.16.1.1), commonly known as MerA, is an oxidoreductase enzyme and flavoprotein that catalyzes the reduction of Hg^{2+} to Hg^{0}. Mercury(II) reductase is found in the cytoplasm of many eubacteria in both aerobic and anaerobic environments and serves to convert toxic mercury ions into relatively inert elemental mercury.

== Gene ==
Mercury(II) reductase, commonly known as MerA, is encoded in a structural gene found on the mer loci or as transposon 501 (Tn501). It shares the same promoter region as mercury transport class proteins, such as MerP and MerT, and regulatory factor MerD. MerA transcription is regulated by both MerR and MerD.

== Function ==
Free mercury ions can bind to metalloproteins, particularly those with cysteine residues, and can cause incorrect conformations resulting in function loss. This can cause death in many bacteria, as can many other heavy metals, and thus, needs to be removed from the cell or transformed into a chemically inert form. Mercury(II) reductase takes Hg^{2+} and catalyzes its reduction into Hg^{0} which is then released from the cell as a vapour. Mercury in its elemental form does not have the ability to form stable complexes with amino acid residues in proteins so is less dangerous than its ionic form.

== Mechanism ==
Hg^{2+} + NADPH → Hg^{0} + H^{+} + NADP^{+}

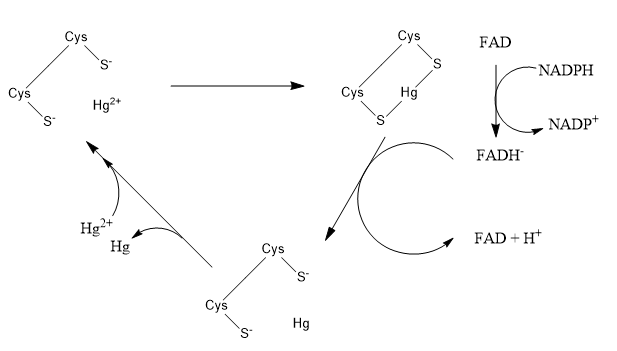
Active site mechanism of mercuric reductase

1. Hg^{2+} + 2Cys-S^{−} → Cys-S-Hg-S-Cys

2. FAD + NADPH → FADH^{−} + NADP^{+}

3. Cys-S-Hg-S-Cys + FADH^{−} → H^{+} + Hg^{0} + FAD + 2Cys-S^{−}

The substrates used in mercuric(II) reductase, as shown above, are Hg^{2+} and NADPH. In the catalytic active site of the enzyme, Hg^{2+} is held as a complex with two cysteine thiolates in a linear geometry. NADPH from the cytoplasm of the cell undergo a hydride transfer with an embedded FAD forming FADH^{−}. The resulting FADH^{−} then reduces Hg^{2+} into Hg^{0}, in turn being oxidized back into FAD. After reduction, the mercury is then released from the enzyme as a volatile vapour.

Mercury(II) reductase cannot completely reduce organomercury compounds such as methyl mercury. Thus, MerB cleaves the carbon-mercury bonds via protonolysis and forms a mercury dithiolate complex, upon which MerB transports the mercury directly to MerA for reduction.

== Structure ==
The active form of mercury(II) reductase is found as a homodimer. It has a quaternary conformation and the monomer is composed of two domains.

=== NmerA ===
One of the domains of mercuric reductase, NmerA, has a structural fold of βαββαβ. It is attached to the active site through linkers made of around 30 amino acids. NmerA contains two cysteine residues which function in the acquisition of Hg^{2+} from other proteins or inorganic ligands such as MerT and direct transport to the catalytic active site of MerA. Very few mercuric(II) reductases have been found to lack the NmerA domain.

=== Active site ===
The active site of MerA consists of four cysteine residues, a FAD, and a tyrosine residue. When bound to a Hg^{2+}, a complex is formed with at least two cysteine thiolates at any time until release. Two cysteine residues (Cys-136 and Cys-141) are buried within the protein and the other two cysteine residues (Cys-558' and Cys-559') are found near the surface near the C terminus. The buried cysteine residues function as the site of catalysis whereas the surface cysteine residues function as transport to the site of catalysis.

During Hg^{2+} transfer to the catalytic active site from the C terminus cysteine residues, a trigonal planar intermediate is formed stabilized by hydrogen bonding of a water molecule to the thiolates. The water molecule is held in place by hydrogen bonding from the hydroxyl group of a nearby tyrosine residue (Tyr-194).

== Mercury transport ==
Various proteins assist in transporting mercury to mercury(II) reductase. MerP, a periplasmic mercury transport protein found in gram negative bacteria, transports mercury through the outer membrane into the inner membrane where it holds the mercury for another protein to bind to it and transport it to mercury(II) reductase. MerT, a membrane bound protein found in both gram negative and gram positive bacteria, binds to free floating mercury. Mercury(II) reductase can directly take mercury from MerT and MerP.

When mercury enters the cell and is not bound to a membrane protein, mercury(II) reductase can transport it to its active site on its own depending on the size of its ligands. If the ligands attached to mercury are large, mercury(II) reductase uses the C-terminus cysteine residues to transport the mercury to its active site. If the ligands are small, mercury can go directly the active site for reduction. The ligands can be removed by the NmerA domain.

In the case of organomercury compounds, MerB breaks the Hg-C bonds and transports the Hg to mercuric(II) reductase.

== Regulation ==
When not bound to Hg^{2+}, mercury(II) reductase acts as an oxidase creating toxic hydrogen peroxide. Thus, excess of the enzyme can result in bacterial death. Bacteria developed two regulatory proteins, MerR and MerD, for mercury(II) reductase. There are two promoter regions on the mer loci: The first region encodes regulator protein MerR, and the second region encodes the structural mer genes and the gene for the regulatory protein MerD. Both promoter regions overlap.

MerR binds to an operator in the structural mer gene promoter called MerO. This binding causes the DNA of the mer loci to bend to where RNA polymerase can not read the region. However, Hg^{2+} can bind to MerR and allosterically change the shape of the DNA, so that RNA polymerase can read the promoter region of the structural genes. Since both promoter regions overlap when apoMerR is bound to MerO, the change in DNA conformation causes neither the structural genes nor the regulatory genes to be read. This makes MerR a negative autoregulator.

MerR forms a stable trigonal planar complex with Hg^{2+}, which causes it to be released much later than when mercury(II) reductase has reduced all free Hg^{2+} in the cytoplasm. Thus, it causes an excess in production of mercuric(II) reductase. To circumvent this problem, MerD also binds to MerO in order to act antagonistically to Hg^{2+} bound MerR. MerD is produced when MerR is active with Hg^{2+} since MerD is encoded in the structural mer genes.

== Applications and uses ==
In waste-water treatment procedures, mercury is sometimes removed from the water by making the water flow through a biofilm rich with mercury(II) reductase-containing bacteria.
