= Dimethylmercury =

Organomercury chemical compound

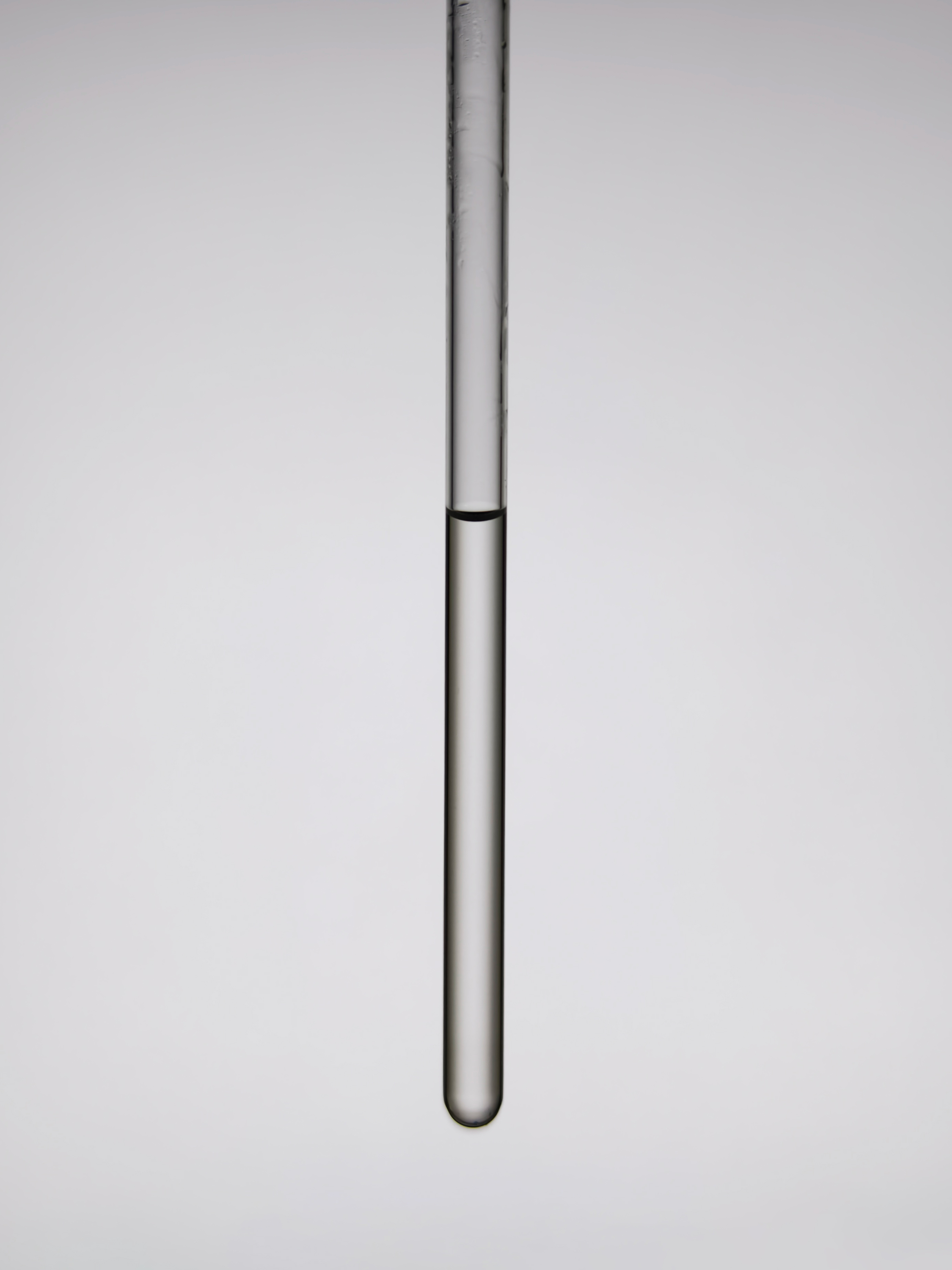
- Dimethylmercury in NMR tube

- Skeletal formula of dimethylmercury with all hydrogens added

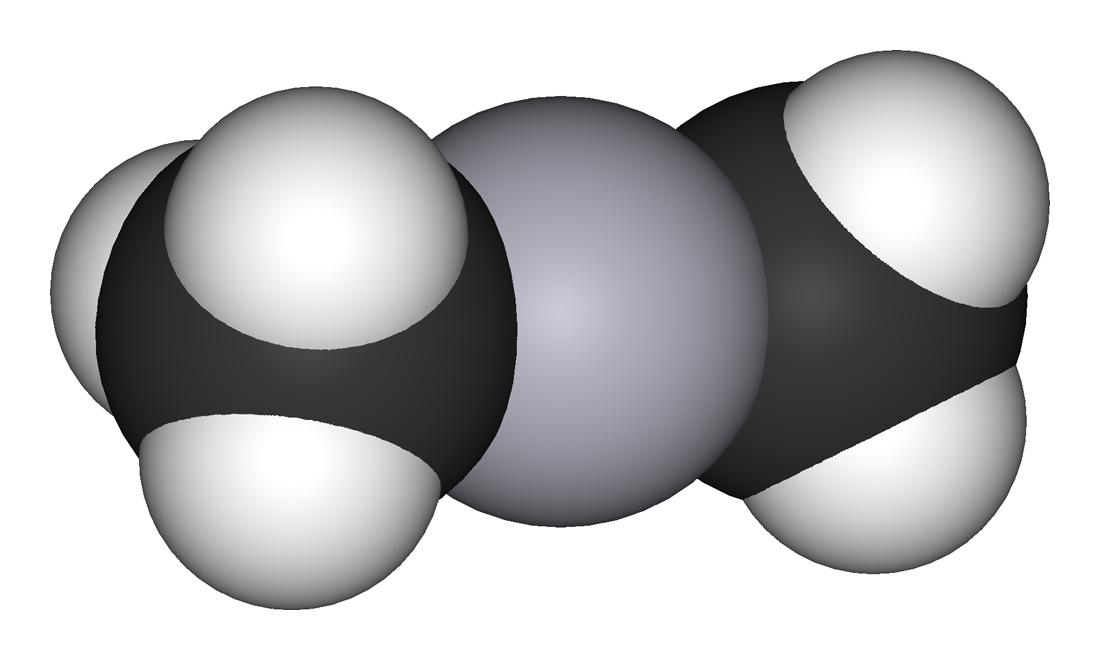

Names
- IUPAC name Dimethylmercury
- Other names Mercury dimethanide

Identifiers
CAS Number	593-74-8
3D model (JSmol)	Interactive image
Abbreviations	DMM; Me_{2}Hg
Beilstein Reference	3600205
ChEBI	CHEBI:30786
ChemSpider	11155
ECHA InfoCard	100.008.916
EC Number	209-805-3
Gmelin Reference	25889
MeSH	dimethyl+mercury
PubChem CID	11645
RTECS number	OW3010000
UNII	C60TQU15XY
UN number	2929
CompTox Dashboard (EPA)	DTXSID5047742
- InChI: InChI=1S/2CH3.Hg/h2*1H3; Key: ATZBPOVXVPIOMR-UHFFFAOYSA-N
- SMILES: C[Hg]C

Properties
Chemical formula	C_{2}H_{6}Hg (CH_{3})_{2}Hg
Molar mass	230.66 g mol^{−1}
Appearance	Colorless liquid
Odor	Sweet
Density	2.961 g mL^{−1}
Melting point	−43 °C (−45 °F; 230 K)
Boiling point	93 to 94 °C (199 to 201 °F; 366 to 367 K)
Refractive index (n_{D})	1.543

Thermochemistry
Std enthalpy of formation (Δ_{f}H^{⦵}_{298})	57.9–65.7 kJ mol^{−1}

Hazards
- Occupational safety and health (OHS/OSH)
Main hazards	Extremely toxic, extremely flammable, persistent environmental pollutant
- GHS labelling
Pictograms	(GHS06: Toxic) (GHS08: Health hazard) (GHS02: Flammable) (GHS09: Environmental hazard)
Signal word	Danger
Hazard statements	H224, H300+H310+H330, H370, H372, H410
Precautionary statements	P260, P264, P273, P280, P284, P301+P310
NFPA 704 (fire diamond)	4 4 3
Flash point	5 °C (41 °F; 278 K)

Related compounds
Other anions	Diethylmercury; Diphenylmercury
Other cations	Dimethylzinc; Dimethylcadmium; Dimethylmagnesium
- Except where otherwise noted, data are given for materials in their standard state (at 25 °C [77 °F], 100 kPa). verify (what is ?) Infobox references

Dimethylmercury is an extremely toxic organomercury compound with the formula (CH_{3})_{2}Hg. A volatile, flammable, dense and colorless liquid, dimethylmercury is one of the strongest known neurotoxins. Less than 0.1 mL is capable of inducing severe mercury poisoning resulting in death.

== Synthesis, structure, and reactions ==
The compound was one of the earliest organometallics reported, reflecting its considerable stability. The compound was first prepared by George Buckton in 1857 by a reaction of methylmercury iodide with potassium cyanide:

2 CH_{3}HgI + 2 KCN → Hg(CH_{3})_{2} + 2 KI + (CN)_{2} + Hg

Later, Edward Frankland discovered that it could be synthesized by treating sodium amalgam with methyl halides:

Hg + 2 Na + 2 CH_{3}I → Hg(CH_{3})_{2} + 2 NaI

It can also be obtained by alkylation of mercuric chloride with methyllithium:

HgCl_{2} + 2 LiCH_{3} → Hg(CH_{3})_{2} + 2 LiCl

The molecule adopts a linear structure with Hg–C bond lengths of 2.083 Å.

=== Reactivity and physical properties ===
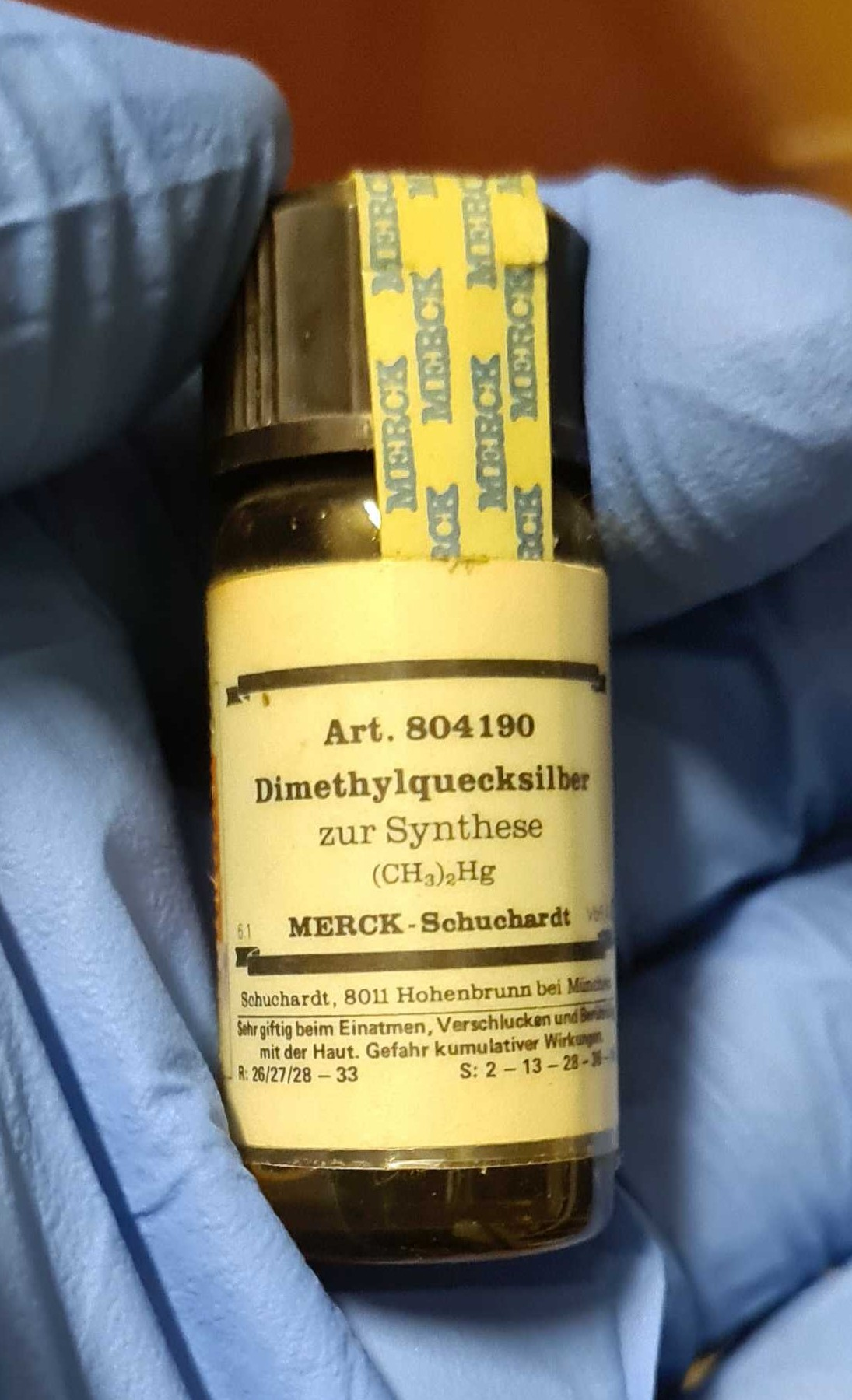
Dimethylmercury in a bottle

Dimethylmercury is stable in water and reacts with mineral acids at a significant rate only at elevated temperatures, whereas the corresponding organocadmium and organozinc compounds (and most metal alkyls in general) hydrolyze rapidly. The difference reflects the high electronegativity of Hg (Pauling EN = 2.00) and the low affinity of Hg(II) for oxygen ligands. The compound undergoes a redistribution reaction with mercuric chloride to give methylmercury chloride:

(CH_{3})_{2}Hg + HgCl_{2} ⇌ 2 CH_{3}HgCl

Whereas dimethylmercury is a volatile liquid, methylmercury chloride is a crystalline solid.

== Use ==
Dimethylmercury has few practical applications because of its danger to human life. It has been studied for reactions involving bonding methylmercury cations to target molecules, forming potent bactericides, but methylmercury's bioaccumulation and ultimate toxicity has led to it being largely abandoned in favor of the less toxic ethylmercury and diethylmercury compounds, which perform a similar function without the bioaccumulation hazard.

In toxicology, it still finds limited use as a reference toxin. It is also used to calibrate NMR instruments for detection of mercury (δ 0 ppm for ^{199}Hg NMR), although diethylmercury and less toxic mercury salts are now preferred.

Around 1960, Phil Pomerantz, a worker at the Bureau of Naval Weapons, suggested that dimethylmercury be used as a fuel mix with red fuming nitric acid. This was never done, although it did lead to testing a red fuming nitric acid-unsymmetrical dimethylhydrazine rocket with elemental mercury being injected into the combustion chamber at the Naval Ordnance Test Station.

== Safety ==
Dimethylmercury is extremely toxic and dangerous to handle. Absorption of doses as low as 0.1 mL can result in severe mercury poisoning. The risks are enhanced because of the compound's high vapor pressure. Since it is highly lipophilic, it is very easily absorbed through the skin and into body fat.

Dimethylmercury can rapidly permeate many materials, including latex, PVC and neoprene. Permeation tests showed that several types of disposable latex or polyvinyl chloride gloves (typically, about 0.1 mm thick), commonly used in most laboratories and clinical settings, had high and maximal rates of permeation by dimethylmercury within 15 seconds. The American Occupational Safety and Health Administration (OSHA) advises handling dimethylmercury with highly resistant laminated gloves with an additional pair of abrasion-resistant gloves worn over the laminate pair, and also recommends using a face shield and working in a fume hood.

Dimethylmercury is metabolized after several days to methylmercury. Methylmercury crosses the blood–brain barrier easily, probably owing to formation of a complex with cysteine. It easily absorbs into the body and has a tendency to bioaccumulate in adipose tissue, plasma proteins and the brain. The symptoms of mercury poisoning may be delayed by months, resulting in cases in which a diagnosis is ultimately discovered, but only at a point in which it is too late or almost too late for an effective treatment regimen to be successful. Symptoms include tingling, nausea and deterioration of balance, speech, hearing and vision. Organomercury poisoning is also known as Minamata disease.

== Incidents ==
- As early as 1865, two workers in the laboratory of Edward Frankland died after exhibiting progressive neurological symptoms following accidental exposure to the compound.
- In 1971, a chemist died in Czechoslovakia after preparing 6,000 grams (13 lb) of dimethylmercury over a three month period.
- Karen Wetterhahn, a professor of chemistry at Dartmouth College, died in 1997, ten months after spilling only a few drops of dimethylmercury onto her latex gloves. This incident resulted in improved awareness of the substance's extreme toxicity and its ability to easily penetrate latex. New material-handling guidelines were published, many institutions purged their supplies of the compound, and it became almost impossible to buy.
- The 2012 death of Christoph Bulwin, a 40-year-old database administrator for IG Bergbau, Chemie, Energie, may have been caused by an attack involving dimethylmercury.
- On August 26, 2026, a graduate student at the Massachusetts Institute of Technology visited a local emergency room after self-reporting an exposure to synthesized dimethylmercury. The student showed "no sign of exposure to mercury" in initial blood tests, per a statement from MIT officials. The incident prompted a several day closure of the Camille Edouard Dreyfus Chemistry Building, more commonly known as Building 18, amid "specialized decontamination efforts." Subsequent investigation questioned whether the student had synthesized the compound.
