= Death of Christoph Bulwin =

2011/2012 suspected murder of a German man

Christoph Bulwin was a German man who died on 9 May 2012, of complications related to mercury poisoning. He had allegedly been poisoned a year earlier with a syringe attached to an umbrella by an unidentified perpetrator.

== Christoph Bulwin ==
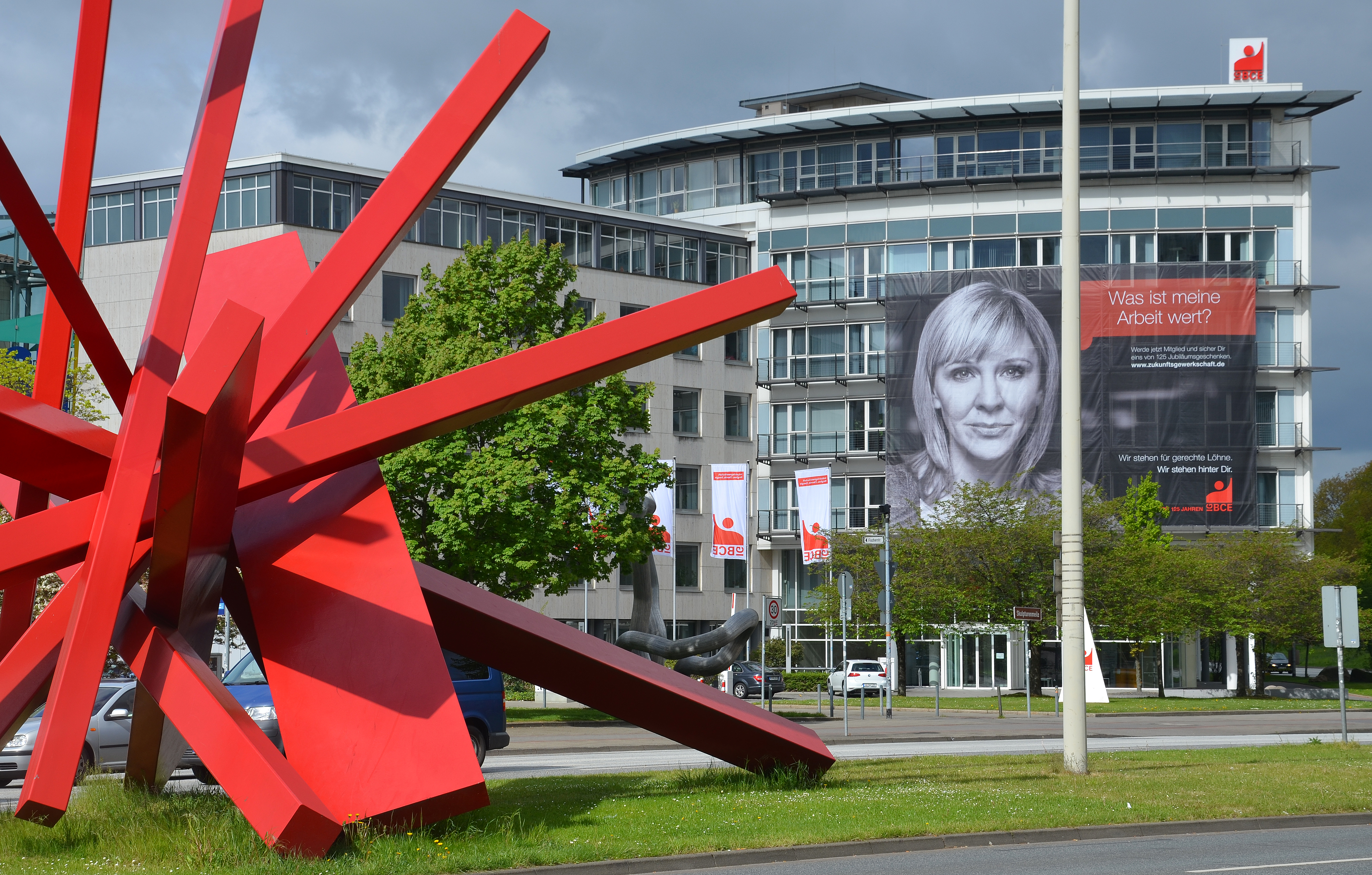
The IG BCE headquarters on Königsworther Platz 6 in Hanover, where Bulwin worked

Christoph Bulwin was 40 years old at the time of the events and was married with two children. The family lived in the Celle area about 50 kilometres (31 miles) from Hanover where he worked as a software engineer and database administrator for IG Bergbau, Chemie, Energie, a trade union for miners, chemical and energy workers.

== Attack ==
According to Bulwin's testimony, on 15 July 2011, at 03:55pm he was walking from his office to his car on Fischerstraße when he passed a man waiting with an umbrella in his hand. Bulwin perceived the man as suspicious and crossed the road, but the man started following him. When he was passed, Bulwin felt a sting in his left buttock. He approached the man and saw that he was holding an umbrella with a pointed object attached to its tip. According to public TV broadcaster ZDF, Bulwin grabbed the umbrella and got hold of a syringe that seemed to have been attached with tape to the umbrella. According to the magazine Focus, the syringe fell out of the umbrella. The unidentified man fled the scene in the direction of Jägerstraße.

Bulwin first suspected an attack with HIV. An ambulance took him to a near hospital where he was checked but no abnormalities were found. He requested prophylactic medication against HIV but soon stopped taking it due to the strong side effects. Besides that, he did not have any symptoms for the first days after the incident.

== Progression of symptoms and death ==
About a week after the incident, Bulwin started experiencing symptoms of poisoning such as a rash and severe headache. Later, his skin started to peel off. After two months, he fell into a comatose state. Around the same time, the doctors identified the cause of the symptoms as poisoning with dimethylmercury:

| | Mercury | Methylmercury | Thallium |
|---|---|---|---|
| EDTA Blood (initial measurement) | 4255 μg/l (< 2 μg/l) | not tested | < 0,2 μg/l (< 0,6 μg/l) |
| EDTA Blood (DMPS treatment) | 2929 μg/l (< 2 μg/l) | 1538 μg/l (< 1 μg/l) | not tested |
| Venous blood (autopsy) | 6,4 μg/l (< 2 μg/l) | 3,6 μg/l (< 1 μg/l) | < 0,2 μg/l (< 0,6 μg/l) |
| Liver (autopsy) | 7100 μg/kg (< 490 μg/kg) | not tested | not tested |
| Kidney (autopsy) | 2100 μg/kg (< 9,1 μg/kg) | not tested | not tested |

(clinical reference values in parentheses)

However, the diagnosis came too late for an effective therapy. Bulwin did not wake from his coma, and died on 9 May 2012, from an epileptic shock. He was in a nursing home at the time.

A postmortem was conducted two days after his death. The key findings were reported to be:

- the deceased was 173 cm (5 ft 8 in) tall and weighed 69 kg
- leg muscle atrophy
- atrophic brain "without any signs of bleeding or acute ischemia. The right occipital lobe showed a caved area with a diameter of 3 cm and marked cortex atrophy. Both hippocampus regions were of below average size."
- kidneys with marked edema, no pathological changes in other organs

The death was reported to be due to "refractory status epilepticus which is compatible with brain atrophy potentially resulting from methylmercury intoxication."

== Police investigation ==
Two days after the attack police put out an appeal for witnesses. The attacker was described as:

- about 45 years old
- wearing a dark baseball hat and a black, shiny faux leather jacket
- about 1.75 m (5 ft 9 in) tall and slim
- tanned and dry complexion
- wearing a large band-aid on his right cheek

During the investigation at the scene several witnesses reported sightings of a man who matched this description. According to the witnesses, this man had waited close to the office building where Bulwin worked and had been seen there days and even weeks before the attack. One witness described an encounter during which the suspect complained about the witness's dog.

In 2013, the police closed the investigation. On 24 August 2022, the case was featured in the TV show Aktenzeichen XY... ungelöst where the German criminal police presents unsolved criminal cases which are reenacted. After the broadcast, a police officer in charge of evaluating call-ins during the show reported numerous new clues with two very promising leads. However, no substantial progress has been made as of 2023.

In 2025, it was reported that DNA traces of two different men had been found on the syringe, neither of which had been identified.

== Theories about the attacker's motive ==
Due to the lack of a plausible motive, the attack was speculated to be due to mistaken identity. A possible connection to the victim's employer, a major trade union, was also proposed. However, neither theory could be substantiated.

== Conflicting accounts about possible suicide ==
The account presented by the media as well as police statements both after the attack and in 2022 contradict claims made in a 2020 article about the case in the journal Forensic Science, Medicine and Pathology. The latter source claims:

Police learned of the case after the mercury intoxication was diagnosed, and the investigation revealed a small syringe (typically used for subcutaneous injections, e.g. insulin) containing a fluid with a mercury-thallium bond as well as several beads of metallic mercury bonds at the dashboard (e.g. non-organic mercury, mercury sulphate) of the victim’s car. Furthermore, it turned out that the victim had access to mercury compounds due to his occupation.

The mercury Bulwin allegedly had access to was "low temperature thermometers at his workplace [that] contained metallic mercury and 8.5% or 40% thallium." However, "only a small quantity of thallium could have been injected if the man had used the fluid found in his car. It is therefore not likely that an injection of such a preparation led to the patient’s disease". The article stated that the findings made in Bulwin's car "led the police to conclude that the intoxication was most probably self-administered and not the consequence of an attack by a perpetrator. Therefore, the preliminary investigation was terminated."

In contrast, neither press coverage nor the 2022 case presentation on TV by the criminal police mentioned either the finding of suspicious objects in Bulwin's car or the fact that police suspected the attack to be a hoax. Moreover, the criminal investigator presenting the case on TV specifically described the substance Bulwin was poisoned with as an "organic mercury compound" that could only have been prepared by an expert in chemistry, thus limiting the circle of potential suspects.

Since police had put out an appeal for witnesses as early as two days after the alleged attack, it is impossible that they would have learned of the case only after the diagnosis, as claimed in the Forensic Science, Medicine and Pathology article.

According to web.de, the investigation was stopped in 2013 when details such as a life insurance policy and what is described as "traces on the dashboard of Bulwin's car" led police to consider the case a suicide. The investigation was resumed in 2019 when a possible connection to the case of the "sandwich murderer" (German "Pausenbrotmörder") was discussed.

== Pausenbrotmörder ==
In 2018, a 57-year-old man in Bielefeld was arrested under the suspicion of having poisoned several coworkers by spreading poisonous compounds on their lunch sandwiches (German "Pausenbrot") and into their beverages. The alleged crimes happened between 2015 and 2018 and were discovered using surveillance footage. One victim died, several others were seriously injured. A possible connection between the cases was investigated because the sandwich murderer used dimethylmercury among other substances. However, no DNA match could be established.

== See also ==
- List of unsolved deaths
