= Ethylmercury =

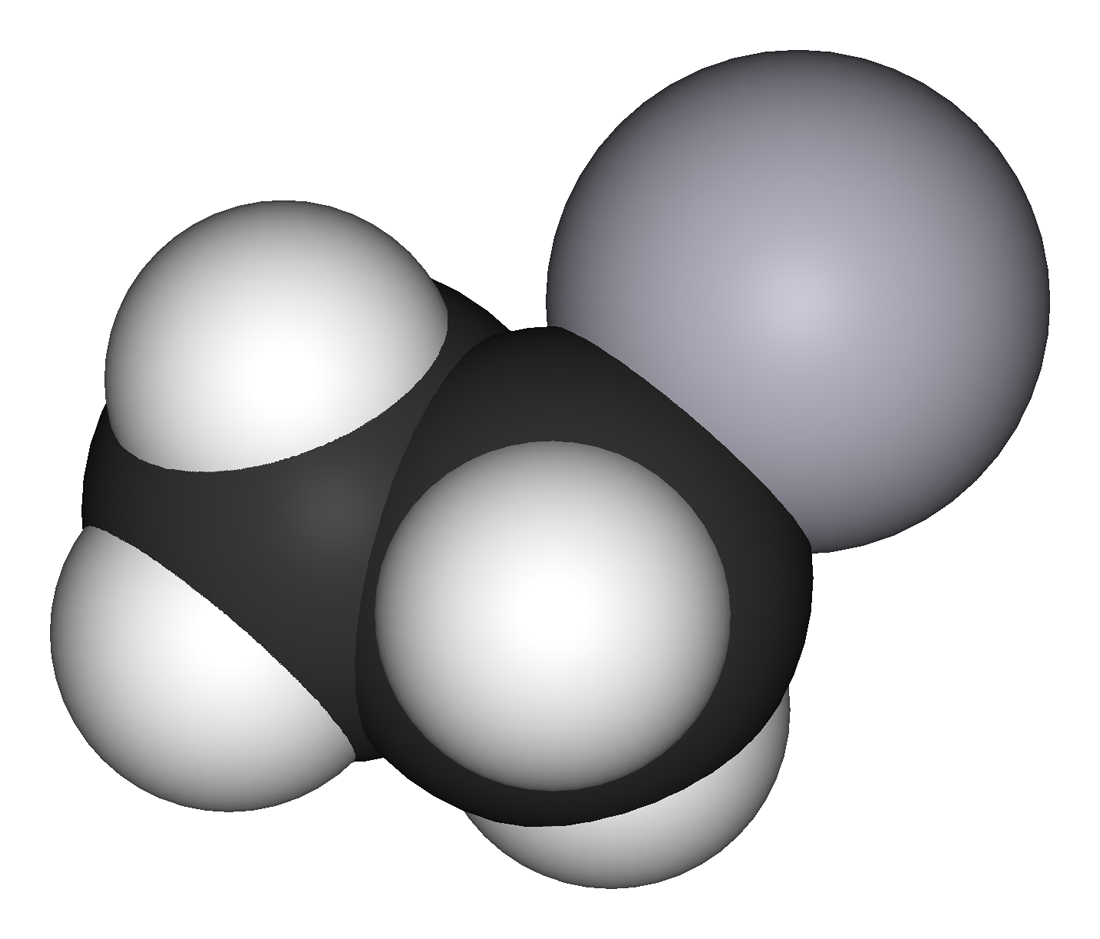

Identifiers
CAS Number	21687-36-5; chloride: 107-27-7; bromide: 107-26-6; iodide: 2440-42-8
3D model (JSmol)	Interactive image; chloride: Interactive image; bromide: Interactive image; iodide: Interactive image
Beilstein Reference	3903035
ChEBI	CHEBI:33204; chloride: CHEBI:152058
ChemSpider	5247; chloride: 7574; bromide: 60302; iodide: 68068
EC Number	chloride: 203-478-0; bromide: 203-477-5; iodide: 219-471-0
Gmelin Reference	323460
PubChem CID	5442; chloride: 7862; bromide: 66943; iodide: 75543
UNII	chloride: M04218TP6P
CompTox Dashboard (EPA)	DTXSID00274466; chloride: DTXSID9042128
- InChI: InChI=1S/C2H5.Hg/c1-2;/h1H2,2H3;/q;+1 Key: MJOUBOKSWBMNGQ-UHFFFAOYSA-N; chloride: InChI=1S/C2H5.ClH.Hg/c1-2;;/h1H2,2H3;1H;/q;;+1/p-1 Key: QWUGXIXRFGEYBD-UHFFFAOYSA-M; bromide: InChI=1S/C2H5.BrH.Hg/c1-2;;/h1H2,2H3;1H;/q;;+1/p-1 Key: UREACWLAXSOUKG-UHFFFAOYSA-M; iodide: InChI=1S/C2H5.Hg.HI/c1-2;;/h1H2,2H3;;1H/q;+1;/p-1 Key: BYIGJUQTUPMNMF-UHFFFAOYSA-M
- SMILES: CC[Hg+]; chloride: CC[Hg]Cl; bromide: CC[Hg]Br; iodide: CC[Hg]I

Properties
Chemical formula	C_{2}H_{5}Hg^{+}
Molar mass	229.65 g/mol
- Except where otherwise noted, data are given for materials in their standard state (at 25 °C [77 °F], 100 kPa). verify (what is ?) Infobox references

Ethylmercury (sometimes ethyl mercury) is a cation composed of an organic CH_{3}CH_{2}— species (an ethyl group) bound to a mercury(II) centre, making it a type of organometallic cation, and giving it a chemical formula C_{2}H_{5}Hg^{+}. The main source of ethylmercury is thiomersal.

== Synthesis and structure ==
Structures of two main types of complexes derived from "ethylmercury". X^{−} = anion, L = neutral Lewis base.

Ethylmercury (C_{2}H_{5}Hg^{+}) is a substituent of compounds: it occurs as a component of compounds of the formula C_{2}H_{5}HgX where X = chloride, thiolate, or another organic group. Most famously X = the mercaptide group of thiosalicylic acid as in thiomersal. In the body, ethylmercury is most commonly encountered as derivatives with a thiolate attached to the mercury. In these compounds, Hg(II) has a linear or sometimes trigonal coordination geometry. Given the comparable electronegativities of mercury and carbon, the mercury-carbon bond is described as covalent.

== Toxicity ==
The toxicity of ethylmercury is well studied. Like methylmercury, ethylmercury distributes to all body tissues, crossing the blood–brain barrier and the placental barrier, and ethylmercury also moves freely throughout the body. Risk assessment for effects on the human nervous system have been made by extrapolating from dose-response relationships for methylmercury. Estimates have suggested that ethylmercury clears from blood with a half-life of 3–7 days in adult humans. In monkeys, it clears from brain tissue with a half-life of 24 days and blood in 7 days.

It is a fungicide but has been banned from use in the U.S. on food grain and even on seeds only used to grow crops.

== Public health concerns ==
Concerns based on extrapolations of the effect of methylmercury caused thiomersal to be removed from U.S. childhood vaccines in 1999, but it remains in use in all multi-dose vaccines and flu shots (though many single-use vaccines without thiomersal are available). Researchers have argued that risk assessments based on methylmercury were overly conservative in light of observations that ethylmercury is eliminated from the body and the brain significantly faster than methylmercury. Moreover, the same researchers have argued that inorganic mercury metabolized from ethylmercury, despite its much longer half-life in the brain, is much less toxic than the inorganic mercury produced from mercury vapor, for reasons not yet understood.

== See also ==
- Diethylmercury
- Mercury poisoning
