= Mercury poisoning =

Poisoning caused by mercury chemicals

- Other names: Mercury toxicity, mercury overdose, mercury intoxication, hydrargyria, mercurialism
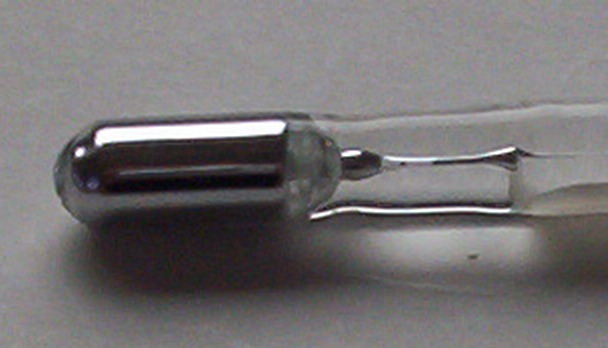
- The bulb of a mercury-in-glass thermometer
- Specialty: Toxicology
- Symptoms: Muscle weakness, poor coordination, numbness in the hands and feet
- Complications: Kidney problems, decreased intelligence
- Causes: Exposure to mercury
- Risk factors: Consumption of fish, which may contain mercury
- Diagnostic method: Difficult
- Prevention: Decreasing use of mercury, low mercury diet
- Medication: Acute poisoning: dimercaptosuccinic acid (DMSA), dimercaptopropane sulfonate (DMPS)

Mercury poisoning is a type of metal poisoning due to exposure to mercury. Symptoms depend upon the type, dose, method, and duration of exposure. They may include muscle weakness, poor coordination, numbness in the hands and feet, skin rashes, anxiety, memory problems, trouble speaking, trouble hearing, or trouble seeing. High-level exposure to methylmercury is known as Minamata disease. Methylmercury exposure in children may result in acrodynia (pink disease) in which the skin becomes pink and peels. Long-term complications may include kidney problems and decreased intelligence. The effects of long-term exposure to methylmercury at very low doses are unclear.

Forms of mercury exposure include metal, vapor, salt, and organic compound. Most exposure is from eating fish, amalgam-based dental fillings, or exposure at a workplace. In fish, those higher up in the food chain generally have higher levels of mercury, a process known as biomagnification. Less commonly, poisoning may occur as a method of attempted suicide. Human activities that release mercury into the environment include the burning of coal, incineration of trash, and mining of gold. Tests of the blood, urine, and hair for mercury are available but do not relate well to the amount in the body.

Prevention includes eating a diet low in mercury, removing mercury from medical and other devices, proper disposal of mercury, and not mining further mercury. In those with acute poisoning from inorganic mercury salts, chelation with either dimercaptosuccinic acid (DMSA) or dimercaptopropane sulfonate (DMPS) appears to improve outcomes if given within a few hours of exposure. Chelation for those with long-term exposure is of unclear benefit. In certain communities that survive on fishing, rates of mercury poisoning among children have been as high as 1.7 per 100.

== Signs and symptoms ==
Common symptoms of mercury poisoning are peripheral neuropathy, presenting as paresthesia or itching, burning, pain, or even a sensation that resembles small insects crawling on or under the skin (formication); skin discoloration (pink cheeks, fingertips and toes); swelling; desquamation (shedding or peeling of skin). and the range of neurological symptoms associated with erethism.

Mercury irreversibly inhibits selenium-dependent enzymes (see below) and may also inactivate S-adenosyl methionine, which is necessary for catecholamine catabolism by catechol-O-methyltransferase. Due to the body's inability to degrade catecholamines (e.g. adrenaline), a person with mercury poisoning may experience profuse sweating, tachycardia (persistently faster-than-normal heart beat), increased salivation, and hypertension (high blood pressure).

Affected children may show red cheeks, nose and lips, loss of hair, teeth, and nails, transient rashes, hypotonia (muscle weakness), and increased sensitivity to light. Other symptoms may include kidney dysfunction (e.g. Fanconi syndrome) or neuropsychiatric symptoms such as emotional lability, memory impairment, or insomnia.

Thus, the clinical presentation may resemble pheochromocytoma or Kawasaki disease. Desquamation (skin peeling) can occur with severe mercury poisoning acquired by handling elemental mercury.

== Causes ==
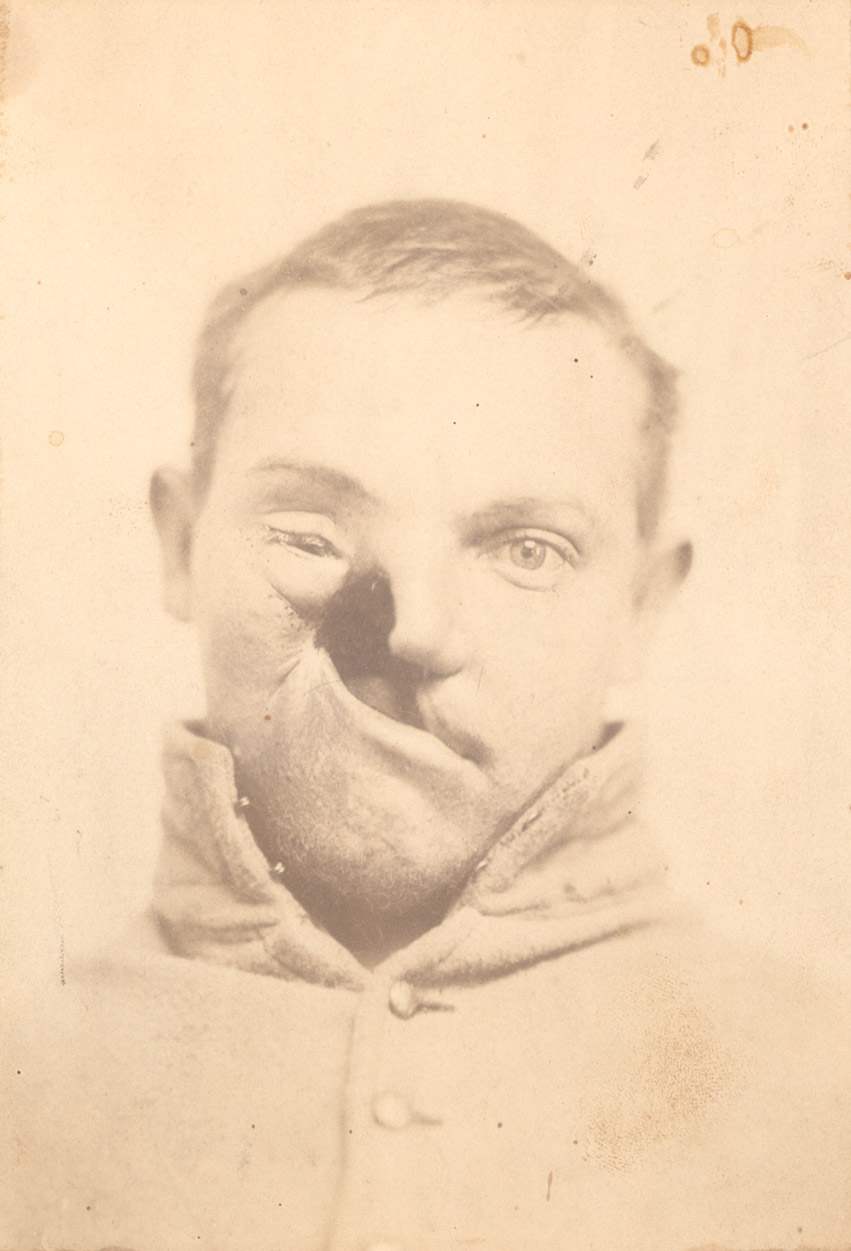
In 1862 soldier Carleton Burgan suffered severe facial disfigurement due to mercury poisoning after having an infection treated with calomel, a common medicine that contained mercury.

Historically, medicines could contain mercury and thus do more harm than good to patients. The popular Victorian medicine calomel contained mercury. In her 1859 autobiography, Scottish seamstress Elizabeth Storie describes her life as a disabled woman due to severe mercury poisoning when a doctor attempted to treat a mild childhood disease with prolonged administration of calomel. In 1862, a soldier in the American civil war, Carleton Burgan, suffered a similar disfigurement when he was treated with calomel for an infection.

Today, consumption of fish containing mercury is by far the most significant source of ingestion-related mercury exposure in humans, although plants and livestock also contain mercury due to bioconcentration of organic mercury from seawater, freshwater, marine and lacustrine sediments, soils, and atmosphere, and due to biomagnification by ingesting other mercury-containing organisms. Exposure to mercury can occur from breathing contaminated air, from eating foods that have acquired mercury residues during processing, from exposure to mercury vapor in mercury dental amalgam restorations, and from improper use or disposal of mercury and mercury-containing objects, for example, after spills of elemental mercury or improper disposal of fluorescent lamps.

All of these, except elemental liquid mercury, produce toxicity or death with less than a gram. Mercury's zero oxidation state (Hg^{0}) exists as vapor or as liquid metal, its mercurous state (Hg^{+}) exists as inorganic salts, and its mercuric state (Hg^{2+}) may form either inorganic salts or organomercury compounds.

Consumption of whale and dolphin meat, as is the practice in Japan, is a source of high levels of mercury poisoning. Tetsuya Endo, a professor at the Health Sciences University of Hokkaido, has tested whale meat purchased in the whaling town of Taiji and found mercury levels more than 20 times the acceptable Japanese standard.

Human-generated sources, such as coal-burning power plants emit about half of atmospheric mercury, with natural sources such as volcanoes responsible for the remainder. A 2021 publication investigating the mercury distribution in European soils found that high mercury concentrations are found close to abandoned mines (such as Almadén (Castilla-La Mancha, Spain), Mt. Amiata (Italy), Idrija (Slovenia) and Rudnany (Slovakia)) and coal-fired power plants. An estimated two-thirds of human-generated mercury comes from stationary combustion, mostly of coal. Other important human-generated sources include gold production, nonferrous metal production, cement production, waste disposal, human crematoria, caustic soda production, pig iron and steel production, mercury production (mostly for batteries), and biomass burning.

Small independent gold-mining operation workers are at higher risk of mercury poisoning because of crude processing methods. Such is the danger for the galamsey in Ghana and similar workers known as orpailleurs in neighboring francophone countries. While no official government estimates of the labor force have been made, observers believe 20,000–50,000 work as galamseys in Ghana, a figure including many women, who work as porters. Similar problems have been reported amongst the gold miners of Indonesia.

Some mercury compounds, especially organomercury compounds, can also be readily absorbed through direct skin contact. Mercury and its compounds are commonly used in chemical laboratories, hospitals, dental clinics, and facilities involved in the production of items such as fluorescent light bulbs, batteries, and explosives.

Many traditional medicines, including ones used in Ayurvedic medicine, and in Traditional Chinese medicine, contain mercury and other heavy metals.

Occult practices involving elemental mercury have resulted in approximately 200 cases admitted per year to the National Poisoning Centre of Romania.

=== Sources ===
Organic compounds of mercury tend to be much more toxic than either the elemental form or the salts. These compounds have been implicated in causing brain and liver damage. The most dangerous mercury compound, dimethylmercury, is so toxic that even a few microliters spilled on the skin, or even on a latex glove, can cause death.

==== Methylmercury and related organomercury compounds ====
Methylmercury is the major source of organic mercury for all individuals. Due to bioaccumulation, it works its way up through the food web and thus biomagnifies, resulting in high concentrations among populations of some species. Top predatory fish, such as tuna or swordfish, are usually of greater concern than smaller species. The US FDA and the EPA advise women of child-bearing age, nursing mothers, and young children to completely avoid swordfish, shark, king mackerel and tilefish from the Gulf of Mexico, and to limit consumption of albacore ("white") tuna to no more than 170 g (6 oz) per week, and of all other fish and shellfish to no more than 340 g (12 oz) per week. A 2006 review of the risks and benefits of fish consumption found, for adults, the benefits of one to two servings of fish per week outweigh the risks, even (except for a few fish species) for women of childbearing age, and that avoidance of fish consumption could result in significant excess coronary heart disease deaths and suboptimal neural development in children.

Because the process of mercury-dependent sequestration of selenium is slow, the period between exposure to methylmercury and the appearance of symptoms in adult poisoning cases tends to be extended. The longest recorded latent period is five months after a single exposure, in the Dartmouth case (see History); other latent periods in the range of weeks to months have also been reported. When the first symptom appears, typically paresthesia (a tingling or numbness in the skin), it is followed rapidly by more severe effects, sometimes ending in coma and death. The toxic damage appears to be determined by the peak value of mercury, not the length of the exposure.

Methylmercury exposure during rodent gestation, a developmental period that approximately models human neural development during the first two trimesters of gestation, has long-lasting behavioral consequences that appear in adulthood and, in some cases, may not appear until aging. Prefrontal cortex or dopamine neurotransmission could be especially sensitive to even subtle gestational methylmercury exposure and suggests that public health assessments of methylmercury based on intellectual performance may underestimate the impact of methylmercury in public health.

Ethylmercury is a breakdown product of the antibacteriological agent ethylmercurithiosalicylate, which has been used as a topical antiseptic and a vaccine preservative (further discussed under Thiomersal below). Its characteristics have not been studied as extensively as those of methylmercury. It is cleared from the blood much more rapidly, with a half-life of seven to ten days, and it is metabolized much more quickly than methylmercury. It is presumed not to have methylmercury's ability to cross the blood–brain barrier via a transporter, but instead relies on simple diffusion to enter the brain. Other exposure sources of organic mercury include phenylmercuric acetate and phenylmercuric nitrate. These compounds were used in indoor latex paints for their antimildew properties, but were removed in 1990 because of cases of toxicity.

==== Inorganic mercury compounds ====
Mercury occurs as salts such as mercuric chloride (HgCl_{2}) and mercurous chloride (Hg_{2}Cl_{2}), the latter also known as calomel. Because they are more soluble in water, mercuric salts are usually more acutely toxic than mercurous salts. Their higher solubility lets them be more readily absorbed from the gastrointestinal tract. Mercury salts affect primarily the gastrointestinal tract and the kidneys, and can cause severe kidney damage; however, as they cannot cross the blood–brain barrier easily, these salts inflict little neurological damage without continuous or heavy exposure. Mercuric cyanide (Hg(CN)_{2}) is a particularly toxic mercury compound that has been used in murders, as it contains not only mercury but also cyanide, leading to simultaneous cyanide poisoning. The drug n-acetyl penicillamine has been used to treat mercury poisoning with limited success.

==== Elemental mercury ====
Quicksilver (liquid metallic mercury) is poorly absorbed by ingestion and skin contact. Its vapor is the most hazardous form. Animal data indicate less than 0.01% of ingested mercury is absorbed through the intact gastrointestinal tract, though it may not be true for individuals with ileus. Cases of systemic toxicity from accidental swallowing are rare, and attempted suicide via intravenous injection does not appear to result in systemic toxicity, though it still causes damage by physically blocking blood vessels both at the site of injection and the lungs. Though not studied quantitatively, the physical properties of liquid elemental mercury limit its absorption through intact skin and in light of its very low absorption rate from the gastrointestinal tract, skin absorption would not be high. Some mercury vapor is absorbed dermally, but uptake by this route is only about 1% of that by inhalation.

In humans, approximately 80% of inhaled mercury vapor is absorbed via the respiratory tract, where it enters the circulatory system and is distributed throughout the body. Chronic exposure by inhalation, even at low concentrations in the range 0.7–42 μg/m^{3}, has been shown in case–control studies to cause effects such as tremors, impaired cognitive skills, and sleep disturbance in workers.

Acute inhalation of high concentrations causes a wide variety of cognitive, personality, sensory, and motor disturbances. The most prominent symptoms include tremors (initially affecting the hands and sometimes spreading to other parts of the body), emotional lability (characterized by irritability, excessive shyness, confidence loss, and nervousness), insomnia, memory loss, neuromuscular changes (weakness, muscle atrophy, muscle twitching), headaches, polyneuropathy (paresthesia, stocking-glove sensory loss, hyperactive tendon reflexes, slowed sensory and motor nerve conduction velocities), and performance deficits in tests of cognitive function.

== Mechanism ==
The toxicity of mercury sources can be expected to depend on its nature, i.e., salts vs. organomercury compounds vs. elemental mercury.

The primary mechanism of mercury toxicity involves its irreversible inhibition of selenoenzymes, such as thioredoxin reductase (IC50 = 9 nM). Although it has many functions, thioredoxin reductase restores vitamins C and E, as well as a number of other important antioxidant molecules, back into their reduced forms, enabling them to counteract oxidative damage. Since the rate of oxygen consumption is particularly high in brain tissues, production of reactive oxygen species (ROS) is accentuated in these vital cells, making them particularly vulnerable to oxidative damage and especially dependent upon the antioxidant protection provided by selenoenzymes. High mercury exposures deplete the amount of cellular selenium available for the biosynthesis of thioredoxin reductase and other selenoenzymes that prevent and reverse oxidative damage, which, if the depletion is severe and long lasting, results in brain cell dysfunctions that can ultimately cause death.

Mercury in its various forms is particularly harmful to fetuses as an environmental toxin in pregnancy, as well as to infants. Women who have been exposed to mercury in substantial excess of dietary selenium intakes during pregnancy are at risk of giving birth to children with serious birth defects, such as those seen in Minamata disease. Mercury exposures in excess of dietary selenium intakes in young children can have severe neurological consequences, preventing nerve sheaths from forming properly.

Exposure to methylmercury causes increased levels of antibodies sent to myelin basic protein (MBP), which is involved in the myelination of neurons, and glial fibrillary acidic protein (GFAP), which is essential to many functions in the central nervous system (CNS). This causes an autoimmune response against MBP and GFAP and results in the degradation of neural myelin and general decline in function of the CNS.

== Diagnosis ==
Diagnosis of elemental or inorganic mercury poisoning involves determining the history of exposure, physical findings, and an elevated body burden of mercury. Although whole-blood mercury concentrations are typically less than 6 μg/L, diets rich in fish can result in blood mercury concentrations higher than 200 μg/L; it is not that useful to measure these levels for suspected cases of elemental or inorganic poisoning because of mercury's short half-life in the blood. If the exposure is chronic, urine levels can be obtained; 24-hour collections are more reliable than spot collections. It is difficult or impossible to interpret urine samples of people undergoing chelation therapy, as the therapy itself increases mercury levels in the samples.

Diagnosis of organic mercury poisoning differs in that whole-blood or hair analysis is more reliable than urinary mercury levels.

== Prevention ==
Mercury poisoning can be prevented or minimized by eliminating or reducing exposure to mercury and mercury compounds. To that end, many governments and private groups have made efforts to heavily regulate the use of mercury, or to issue advisories about the use of mercury. Most countries have signed the Minamata Convention on Mercury.

The export from the European Union of mercury and some mercury compounds has been prohibited since 15 March 2011. The European Union has banned most uses of mercury. Mercury is allowed for fluorescent light bulbs because of pressure from countries such as Germany, the Netherlands and Hungary, which are connected to the main producers of fluorescent light bulbs: General Electric, Philips and Osram.

US environmental limits
Country	Regulating agency	Regulated activity	Medium	Type of mercury compound	Type of limit	Limit
US	Occupational Safety and Health Administration	occupational exposure	air	elemental mercury	Ceiling (not to exceed)	0.1 mg/m^{3}
US	Occupational Safety and Health Administration	occupational exposure	air	organic mercury	Ceiling (not to exceed)	0.05 mg/m^{3}
US	Food and Drug Administration	eating	sea food	methylmercury	Maximum allowable concentration	1 ppm (1 mg/L)
US	Environmental Protection Agency	drinking	water	inorganic mercury	Maximum contaminant level	2 ppb (0.002 mg/L)

The United States Environmental Protection Agency (EPA) issued recommendations in 2004 regarding exposure to mercury in fish and shellfish. The EPA also developed the "Fish Kids" awareness campaign for children and young adults on account of the greater impact of mercury exposure to that population.

=== Cleaning spilled mercury ===
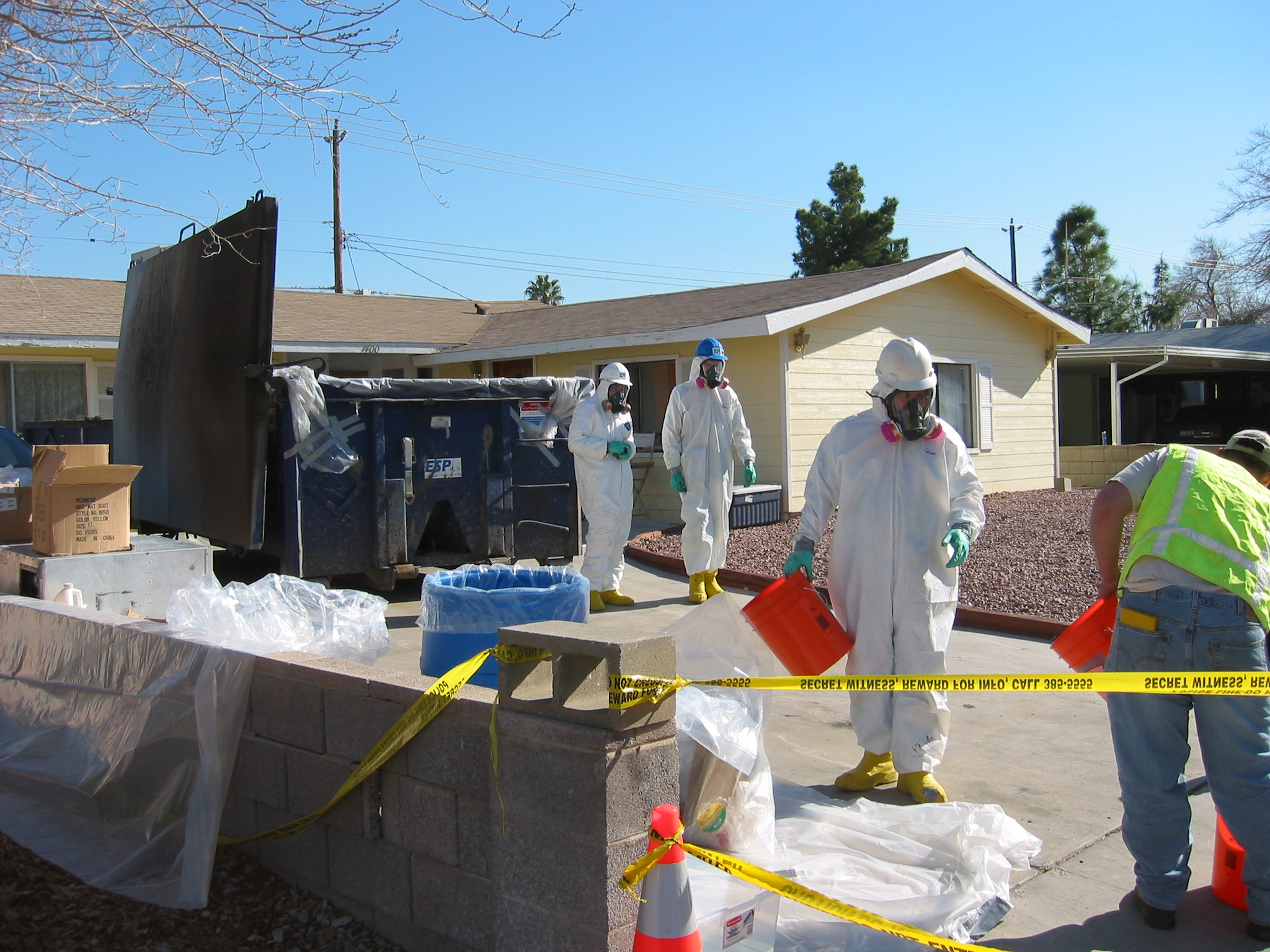
EPA workers clean up residential mercury spill in 2004

Mercury thermometers and mercury light bulbs are not as common as they used to be, and the amount of mercury they contain is unlikely to be a health concern if handled carefully. However, broken items still require careful cleanup, as mercury can be hard to collect and it is easy to accidentally create a much larger exposure problem. If available, powdered sulfur may be applied to the spill, in order to create a solid compound that is more easily removed from surfaces than liquid mercury.

== Treatment ==
Identifying and removing the source of the mercury is crucial. Decontamination requires removal of clothes, washing skin with soap and water, and flushing the eyes with saline solution as needed.

Before the advent of organic chelating agents, salts of iodide were given orally, such as heavily popularized by Louis Melsens and many nineteenth and early twentieth century doctors.

=== Chelation therapy ===
Chelation therapy for acute inorganic mercury poisoning, a formerly common method, was done with DMSA, 2,3-dimercapto-1-propanesulfonic acid (DMPS), D-penicillamine (DPCN), or dimercaprol (BAL). Only DMSA is FDA-approved for use in children for treating mercury poisoning. However, several studies found no clear clinical benefit from DMSA treatment for poisoning caused by mercury vapor. No chelator for methylmercury or ethylmercury is approved by the FDA; DMSA is the most frequently used for severe methylmercury poisoning, as it is given orally, has fewer side-effects, and has been found to be superior to BAL, DPCN, and DMPS. α-Lipoic acid (ALA) has been shown to be protective against acute mercury poisoning in several mammalian species when it is given soon after exposure; correct dosage is required, as inappropriate dosages increase toxicity. Although it has been hypothesized that frequent low dosages of ALA may have potential as a mercury chelator, studies in rats have been contradictory. Glutathione and N-acetylcysteine (NAC) are recommended by some physicians, but have been shown to increase mercury concentrations in the kidneys and the brain.

Chelation therapy can be hazardous if administered incorrectly. In August 2005, edetate disodium, an incorrect form of EDTA for chelation therapy, resulted in hypocalcemia leading to cardiac arrest that killed a five-year-old boy.

=== Other ===
Experimental animal and epidemiological study findings have confirmed the interaction between selenium and methylmercury. Instead of causing a decline in neurodevelopmental outcomes, epidemiological studies have found that improved nutrient (i.e., omega-3 fatty acids, selenium, iodine, vitamin D) intakes as a result of ocean fish consumption during pregnancy improves maternal and fetal outcomes. For example, increased ocean fish consumption during pregnancy was associated with 4–6 point increases in child IQs.

== Prognosis ==
Some of the toxic effects of mercury are partially or wholly reversible provided specific therapy is able to restore selenium availability to normal before tissue damage from oxidation becomes too extensive. Autopsy findings point to a half-life of inorganic mercury in human brains of 27.4 years. Heavy or prolonged exposure can do irreversible damage, in particular in fetuses, infants, and young children. Young's syndrome is believed to be a long-term consequence of early childhood mercury poisoning.

Mercuric chloride may cause cancer as rats and mice treated with the substance have gone on to develop several types of tumors, while male rats treated with methyl mercury have gone on to develop kidney tumors. The EPA has classified mercuric chloride and methyl mercury as possible human carcinogens (ATSDR, EPA)

=== Detection in biological fluids ===
Mercury may be measured in blood or urine to confirm a diagnosis of poisoning in hospitalized people or to assist in the forensic investigation in a case of fatal over dosage. Some analytical techniques are capable of distinguishing organic from inorganic forms of the metal. The concentrations in both fluids tend to reach high levels early after exposure to inorganic forms, while lower but very persistent levels are observed following exposure to elemental or organic mercury. Chelation therapy can cause a transient elevation of urine mercury levels.

== History ==
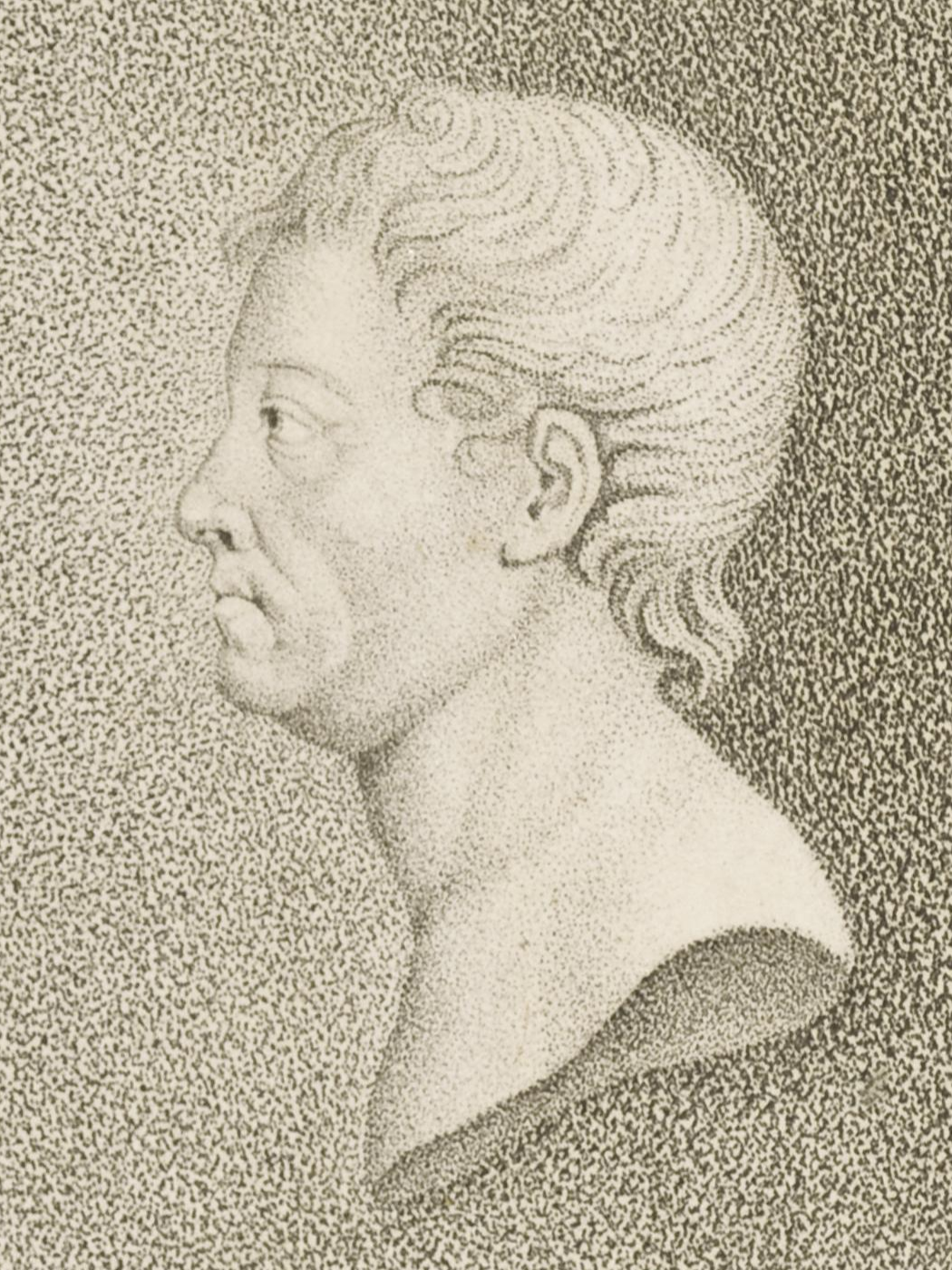
Carl Wilhelm Scheele died of mercury poisoning in 1786, having worked as a chemist during his lifetime.

- Neolithic artists using cinnabar show signs of mercury poisoning.
- Several Chinese emperors and other Chinese nobles are known or suspected to have died or been sickened by mercury poisoning after alchemists administered them "elixirs" to promote health, longevity, or immortality that contained either elemental mercury or (more commonly) cinnabar. Among the most prominent examples:
  - The first emperor of unified China, Qin Shi Huang, it is reported, died in 210 BC of ingesting mercury pills that were intended to give him eternal life.
  - Emperor Xuānzong of Tang, one of the emperors of the late Tang dynasty of China, was prescribed "cinnabar that had been treated and subdued by fire" to achieve immortality. Concerns that the prescription was having ill effects on the emperor's health and sanity were waved off by the imperial alchemists, who cited medical texts listing a number of the emperor's conditions (including itching, formication, swelling, and muscle weakness), today recognized as signs and symptoms of mercury poisoning, as evidence that the elixir was effectively treating the emperor's latent ailments. Xuānzong became irritable and paranoid, and he seems to have ultimately died in 859 from the poisoning.
- In his Natural History, Pliny the Elder writes that "it is a fact generally admitted that [cinnabar] is a poison" and warns against using it in medicine, also noting that workers polishing it "tie on their face loose masks of bladder-skin, to prevent their inhaling the dust in breathing", one of the earliest mentions of PPE.
- Carl Scheele, a significant 18th century Swedish pioneer of chemical research, died from mercury poisoning arising from his work, at the relatively early age of 43.
- The phrase mad as a hatter is likely a reference to mercury poisoning among milliners (so-called "mad hatter disease"), as mercury-based compounds were once used in the manufacture of felt hats in the 18th and 19th century. (The Mad Hatter character of Alice in Wonderland was, it is presumed, inspired by an eccentric furniture dealer named Theophilus Carter. Carter was not a victim of mad hatter disease although Lewis Carroll would have been familiar with the phenomenon of dementia that occurred among hatters.)
- In 1810, two British ships, HMS Triumph and HMS Phipps, salvaged a large load of elemental mercury from a wrecked Spanish vessel near Cadiz, Spain. The bladders containing the mercury soon ruptured. The element spread about the ships in liquid and vapor forms. The sailors presented with neurologic complaints: tremor, paralysis, and excessive salivation as well as tooth loss, skin problems, and pulmonary complaints. In 1823 William Burnett, M.D. published a report on the effects of mercurial vapor. Triumph's surgeon, Henry Plowman, had concluded that the ailments had arisen from inhaling the mercurialized atmosphere. His treatment was to order the lower deck gun ports to be opened, when it was safe to do so; sleeping on the orlop was forbidden; and no men slept in the lower deck if they were at all symptomatic. Windsails were set to channel fresh air into the lower decks day and night.

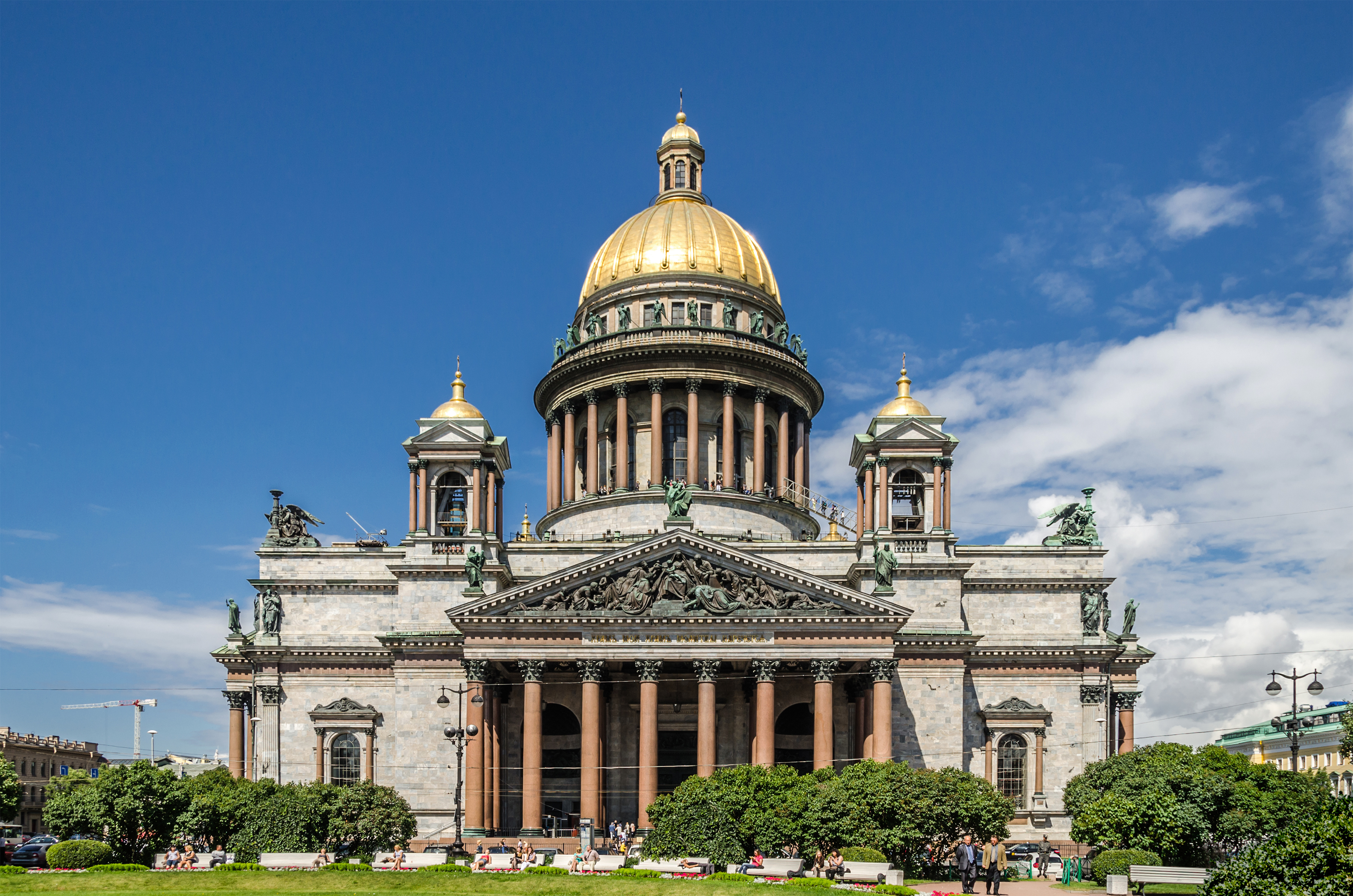
Saint Isaac's Cathedral, in Saint Petersburg, Russia. The gold-mercury amalgam used to gild its dome caused numerous casualties among the workers involved.

- Historically, gold-mercury amalgam was widely used in gilding, applied to the object and then heated to vaporize the mercury and deposit the gold, leading to numerous casualties among the workers. It is estimated that during the construction of Saint Isaac's Cathedral alone, 60 men died from the gilding of the main dome.
- On September 5, 1920, silent movie actress Olive Thomas ingested mercury capsules dissolved in an alcoholic solution at the Hotel Ritz in Paris. There is still controversy over whether it was suicide, or whether she consumed the external preparation by mistake. Her husband, Jack Pickford (the brother of Mary Pickford), had syphilis, and the mercury was used as a treatment of the venereal disease at the time. She died a few days later at the American Hospital in Neuilly.
- An early scientific study of mercury poisoning was in 1923–1926 by the German inorganic chemist Alfred Stock, who himself became poisoned, together with his colleagues, by breathing mercury vapor that was being released by his laboratory equipment—diffusion pumps, float valves, and manometers—all of which contained mercury, and also from mercury that had been accidentally spilt and remained in cracks in the linoleum floor covering. He published a number of papers on mercury poisoning, founded a committee in Berlin to study cases of possible mercury poisoning, and introduced the term micromercurialism.
- The term Hunter-Russell syndrome derives from a study of mercury poisoning among workers in a seed-packaging factory in Norwich, England in the late 1930s who breathed methylmercury that was being used as a seed disinfectant and pesticide.
- Outbreaks of methylmercury poisoning occurred in several places in Japan during the 1950s due to industrial discharges of mercury into rivers and coastal waters. The best-known instances were in Minamata and Niigata. In Minamata alone, more than 600 people died due to what became known as Minamata disease. More than 21,000 people filed claims with the Japanese government, of which almost 3000 became certified as having the disease. In 22 documented cases, pregnant women who consumed contaminated fish showed mild or no symptoms but gave birth to infants with severe developmental disabilities.
- Mercury poisoning of generations of Grassy Narrows and Whitedog native people in Ontario, Canada who were exposed to high levels of mercury by consuming mercury-contaminated fish when Dryden Chemical Company discharged over 9,000 kilograms (20,000 lb) of mercury directly into the Wabigoon–English River system and continued with mercury air pollution until 1975.
- Widespread mercury poisoning occurred in rural Iraq in 1971–1972, when grain treated with a methylmercury-based fungicide that was intended for planting only was used by the rural population to make bread, causing at least 6530 cases of mercury poisoning and at least 459 deaths (see Basra poison grain disaster).
- On August 14, 1996, Karen Wetterhahn, a chemistry professor working at Dartmouth College, spilled a small amount of dimethylmercury on her latex glove. She began experiencing the symptoms of mercury poisoning five months later and, despite aggressive chelation therapy, died a few months later from a mercury induced neurodegenerative disease.
- In April 2000, Alan Chmurny attempted to kill a former employee, Marta Bradley, by pouring mercury into the ventilation system of her car.
- On March 19, 2008, Tony Winnett, 55, inhaled mercury vapors while trying to extract gold from computer parts (by using liquid mercury to separate gold from the rest of the alloy), and died ten days later. His Oklahoma residence became so contaminated that it had to be gutted.
- In December 2008, actor Jeremy Piven was diagnosed with mercury poisoning possibly resulting from eating sushi twice a day for twenty years or from taking herbal remedies.
- In India, a study by Centre for Science and Environment and Indian Institute of Toxicology Research has found that in the country's energy capital Singrauli, mercury is slowly entering people's homes, food, water and even blood.
- The Minamata Convention on Mercury in 2016 announced that the signing of the "international treaty designed to protect human health and the environment from anthropogenic releases and emission of mercury and mercury compounds" on April 22, 2016—Earth Day. It was the sixtieth anniversary of the discovery of the disease.
- In August 2024, chess player Amina Abakarova allegedly attempted to poison her rival, Umayganat Osmanova, by coating chess pieces in mercury from a thermometer.

=== Infantile acrodynia ===
Infantile acrodynia (also known as "calomel disease", "erythredemic polyneuropathy", and "pink disease") is a type of mercury poisoning in children characterized by pain and pink discoloration of the hands and feet. The word is derived from the Greek, where άκρο means end or extremity, and οδυνη means pain. Acrodynia resulted primarily from calomel in teething powders and decreased greatly after calomel was excluded from most teething powders in 1954.

Acrodynia is difficult to diagnose; "it is most often postulated that the etiology of this syndrome is an idiosyncratic hypersensitivity reaction to mercury because of the lack of correlation with mercury levels, many of the symptoms resemble recognized mercury poisoning."

=== Medicine ===
Mercury was once prescribed as a purgative. Many mercury-containing compounds were once used in medicines. These include calomel (mercurous chloride), and mercuric chloride.

==== Thiomersal ====
In 1999, the Centers for Disease Control (CDC) and the American Academy of Pediatrics (AAP) asked vaccine makers to remove the organomercury compound thiomersal (spelled "thimerosal" in the US) from vaccines as quickly as possible, and thiomersal has been phased out of US and European vaccines, except for some preparations of influenza vaccine. The CDC and the AAP followed the precautionary principle, which assumes that there is no harm in exercising caution even if it later turns out to be unwarranted, but their 1999 action sparked confusion and controversy that thiomersal was a cause of autism.

Since 2000, the thiomersal in child vaccines has been alleged to contribute to autism, and thousands of parents in the United States have pursued legal compensation from a federal fund. A 2004 Institute of Medicine (IOM) committee favored rejecting any causal relationship between thiomersal-containing vaccines and autism. Autism incidence rates increased steadily even after thiomersal was removed from childhood vaccines. Currently there is no accepted scientific evidence that exposure to thiomersal is a factor in causing autism.

==== Dental amalgam toxicity ====
Dental amalgam is a possible cause of low-level mercury poisoning due to its use in dental fillings. Discussion on the topic includes debates on whether amalgam should be used, with critics arguing that its toxic effects make it unsafe.

=== Cosmetics ===
Some skin whitening products contain the toxic mercury(II) chloride as the active ingredient. When applied, the chemical readily absorbs through the skin into the bloodstream. The use of mercury in cosmetics is illegal in the United States. However, cosmetics containing mercury are often illegally imported. Following a certified case of mercury poisoning resulting from the use of an imported skin whitening product, the United States Food and Drug Administration warned against the use of such products. Symptoms of mercury poisoning have resulted from the use of various mercury-containing cosmetic products. The use of skin whitening products is especially popular among Asian women. In Hong Kong in 2002, two products were discovered to contain between 9,000 and 60,000 times the recommended dose.

=== Fluorescent lamps ===
Fluorescent lamps contain mercury, which is released when bulbs break. Mercury in bulbs is typically present as either elemental mercury liquid, vapor, or both, since the liquid evaporates at ambient temperature. When broken indoors, bulbs may emit sufficient mercury vapor to present health concerns, and the U.S. Environmental Protection Agency recommends evacuating and airing out a room for at least 15 minutes after breaking a fluorescent light bulb. Breakage of multiple bulbs presents a greater concern. A 1987 report described a 23-month-old toddler who had anorexia, weight loss, irritability, profuse sweating, and peeling and redness of fingers and toes. This case of acrodynia was traced to exposure of mercury from a carton of 8-foot fluorescent light bulbs that had broken in a potting shed adjacent to the main nursery. The glass was cleaned up and discarded, but the child often used the area to play in.

=== Assassination attempts ===
Mercury has, allegedly, been used at various times to assassinate people. In 2008, Russian lawyer Karinna Moskalenko claimed to have been poisoned by mercury left in her car, while in 2010 journalists Viktor Kalashnikov and Marina Kalashnikova accused Russia's FSB of trying to poison them.

In 2011, German Christoph Bulwin was poisoned with a mercury compound from a syringe attached to an umbrella.

In popular culture, mercury poisoning was part of a major plot point in the fifth season of the series, Nip/Tuck, wherein one of the main characters was almost killed from a fruitcake poisoned with mercury.

== See also ==
- Diagnosis Mercury: Money, Politics and Poison
- Environmental impact of the coal industry
- Got Mercury?, a public awareness campaign
- Mercury vacuum
- Mercury-Containing and Rechargeable Battery Management Act
- Niigata Minamata disease
- Ontario Minamata disease
- Mercury contamination in Grassy Narrows, Ontario, Canada
- Mercury cycle
- Mercury methylation
