= Methylmercury =

Toxic mercury cation

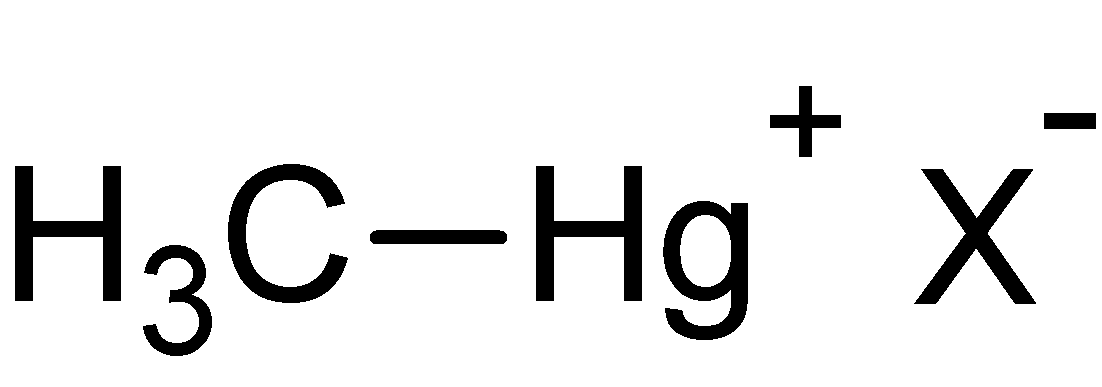

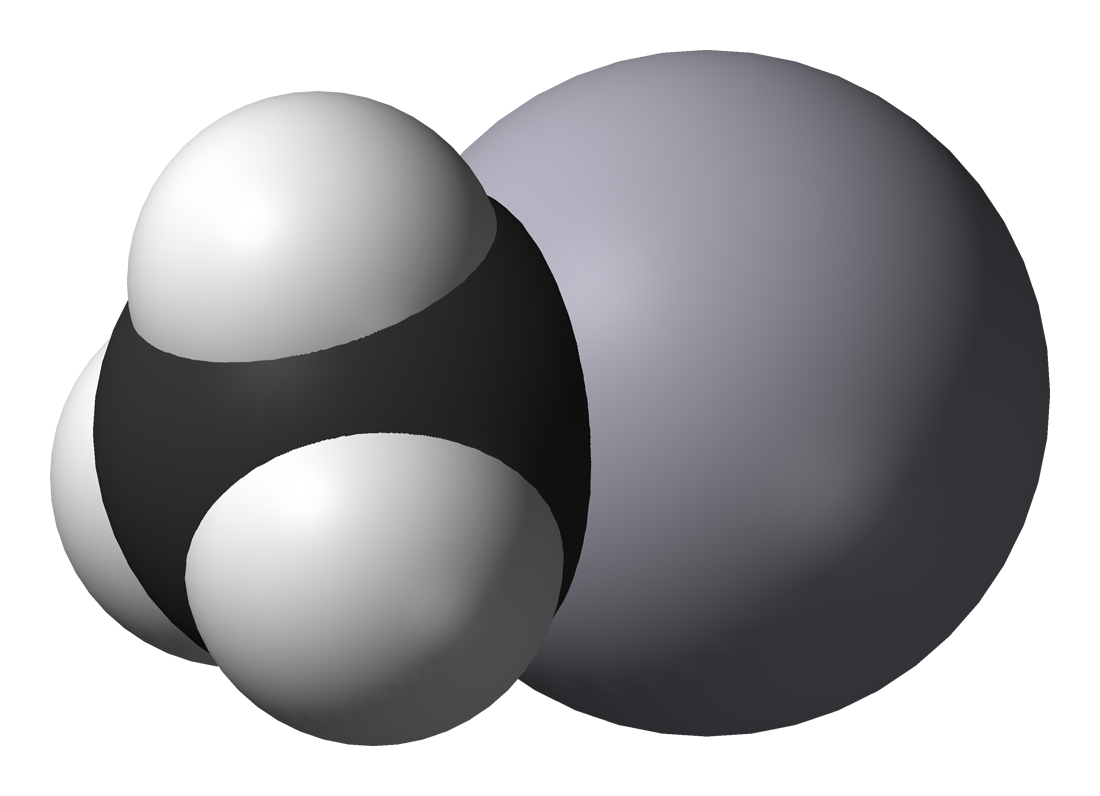

Identifiers
CAS Number	22967-92-6
3D model (JSmol)	Interactive image
ChEBI	CHEBI:30785
ChemSpider	6599
ECHA InfoCard	100.223.040
PubChem CID	6860 (+1); 409301 chloride
CompTox Dashboard (EPA)	DTXSID9024198
- InChI: Key: MJOUBOKSWBMNGQ-UHFFFAOYSA-N
- SMILES: C[Hg+]

Properties
Chemical formula	CH_{3}Hg
Molar mass	215.63 g/mol

Related compounds
Related compounds	Ethylmercury; Dimethylmercury
- Except where otherwise noted, data are given for materials in their standard state (at 25 °C [77 °F], 100 kPa). verify (what is ?) Infobox references

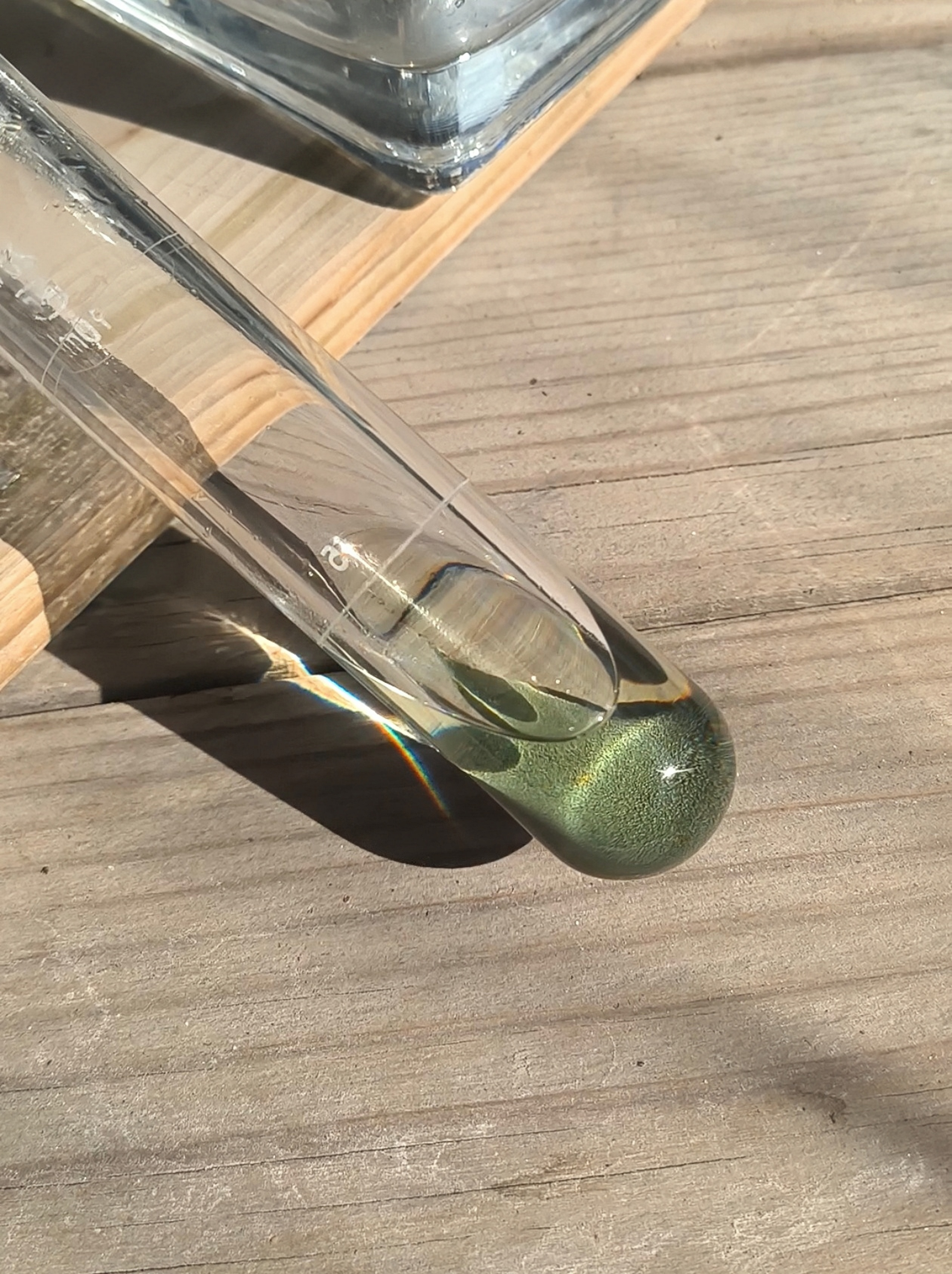
Methylation reaction of mercury under sunlight

Structures of two main types of complexes formed by methylmercury. X^{−} = anion, L = neutral Lewis base.

Methylmercury is an organometallic cation with the formula [CH_{3}Hg]^{+}. It is the simplest organomercury compound. Methylmercury is extremely toxic, and its derivatives are the major source of organic mercury for humans. It is a bioaccumulative environmental toxicant with a 50-day elimination half-life in human blood. Methylmercury salts along with dimethylmercury are the causative agents of the infamous Minamata disease.

Methylmercury is designated as a "priority hazardous substance" according to the Directive on Environmental Quality Standards (Directive 2013/39/EU).

The process which creates methylmercury is called mercury methylation.

== Structure and chemistry ==
"Methylmercury" is a shorthand for the hypothetical "methylmercury cation", sometimes written methylmercury(1+) cation or methylmercury(II) cation. This functional group is composed of a methyl group bonded to an atom of mercury. Its chemical formula is CH_{3}Hg^{+} (sometimes written as MeHg^{+}). The Methylmercury compound has an overall charge of +1, with Hg in the +2 oxidation state. Methylmercury exists as a substituent in many complexes of the type [MeHgL]^{+} (L = Lewis base) and MeHgX (X = anion).

As a positively charged ion, it readily combines with anions such as chloride (Cl^{−}), hydroxide (OH^{−}) and nitrate (NO^{−}_{3}). It has particular affinity for sulfur-containing anions, particularly thiols (RS^{−}). Thiols are generated when the amino acid cysteine and the peptide glutathione form strong complexes with methylmercury:

[MeHg]^{+} + RSH → MeHg−SR + H^{+}

== Sources ==
=== Environmental sources ===
Structure of the complex of methylmercury and cysteine. Color code: dark blue = Hg, yellow = S.

Methylmercury is formed from inorganic mercury by the action of microbes that live in aquatic systems including lakes, rivers, wetlands, sediments, soils and the open ocean. This methylmercury production has been primarily attributed to anaerobic bacteria in the sediment. Capable bacteria that can methylate mercury are mostly the sulfate-reducing bacteria (SRB), iron-reducing bacteria (FeRB) and methanogens. Significant concentrations of methylmercury in ocean water columns are strongly associated with nutrients and organic matter remineralization, which indicate that remineralization may contribute to methylmercury production. Direct measurements of methylmercury production using stable mercury isotopes have also been observed in marine waters with increased ice melt being associated with higher levels, but the microbes involved are still unknown., Increased methylmercury concentrations in water and fish have been detected after flooding of soils associated with reservoir creation (e.g. for hydroelectric power generation) and in thermokarst wetlands that form after permafrost thaw.

There are various sources of inorganic mercury that may indirectly contribute to the production of methylmercury from microbes in the environment. Natural sources of mercury released to the atmosphere include volcanoes, forest fires, volatilization from the ocean and weathering of mercury-bearing rocks. Anthropogenic sources of mercury include the burning of wastes containing inorganic mercury and from the burning of fossil fuels, particularly coal. Although inorganic mercury is only a trace constituent of such fuels, their large scale combustion in utility and commercial/industrial boilers in the United States alone results in release of some 80.2 tons (73 metric tons) of elemental mercury to the atmosphere each year, out of total anthropogenic mercury emissions in the United States of 158 tons (144 metric tons)/year.

Whole-lake ecosystem experiments at IISD-ELA in Ontario, Canada, showed that mercury falling directly on a lake had the fastest impacts on aquatic ecosystems as opposed to mercury falling on the surrounding land. This inorganic mercury is converted to methylmercury by bacteria. Different stable isotopes of mercury were added to lakes, wetlands, and uplands, simulating rain, and then mercury concentrations in fish were analyzed to find their source. The mercury applied to lakes was found in young-of-the-year yellow perch within two months, whereas the mercury applied to wetlands and uplands had a slower but longer influx.

Acute methylmercury poisoning can occur either directly from the release of methylmercury into the environment or indirectly from the release of inorganic mercury that is subsequently methylated in the environment. For example, methylmercury poisoning occurred at Grassy Narrows in Ontario, Canada (see Ontario Minamata disease), as a result of mercury released from the mercury-cell Chloralkali process, which uses liquid mercury as an electrode in a process that entails electrolytic decomposition of brine, followed by mercury methylation in the aquatic environment. An acute methylmercury poisoning tragedy occurred also in Minamata, Japan, following release of methylmercury into Minamata Bay and its tributaries (see Minamata disease). In the Ontario case, inorganic mercury discharged into the environment was methylated in the environment; whereas, in Minamata, Japan, there was direct industrial discharge of methylmercury.

=== Dietary sources ===
Because methylmercury is formed in aquatic systems, and because it is not readily eliminated from organisms, it is biomagnified in aquatic food chains from bacteria, to plankton, through macroinvertebrates, to herbivorous fish and to piscivorous (fish-eating) fish. At each step in the food chain, the concentration of methylmercury in the organism increases. The concentration of methylmercury in the top-level aquatic predators can reach a level a million times higher than the level in the water. This is because methylmercury has a half-life of about 72 days in aquatic organisms resulting in its bioaccumulation within these food chains. Organisms, including humans, fish-eating birds, and fish-eating mammals such as otters and cetaceans (i.e. whales and dolphins) that consume fish from the top of the aquatic food chain receive the methylmercury that has accumulated through this process, plus the toxins in their habitat. Fish and other aquatic species are the main source of human methylmercury exposure.

The concentration of mercury in any given fish depends on the species of fish, the age and size of the fish and the type of water body in which it is found. In general, fish-eating fish such as shark, swordfish, marlin, larger species of tuna, walleye, largemouth bass, and northern pike, have higher levels of methylmercury than herbivorous fish or smaller fish such as tilapia and herring. Within a given species of fish, older and larger fish have higher levels of methylmercury than smaller fish. Fish that develop in water bodies that are more acidic also tend to have higher levels of methylmercury.

== Biological impact ==
=== Human health effects ===
Ingested methylmercury is readily and completely absorbed by the gastrointestinal tract. It is mostly found complexed with free cysteine and with proteins and peptides containing that amino acid. The methylmercuric-cysteinyl complex is recognized by amino acids transporting proteins in the body as methionine, another essential amino acid. Because of this mimicry, it is transported freely throughout the body including across the blood–brain barrier and across the placenta, where it is absorbed by the developing fetus. Also for this reason as well as its strong binding to proteins, methylmercury is not readily eliminated. Methylmercury has an elimination half-life in human blood of about 50 days, varying by age, sex, and body weight.

Several studies indicate that methylmercury is linked to subtle developmental deficits in children exposed in utero such as loss of IQ points, and decreased performance in tests of language skills, memory function and attention deficits. Methylmercury exposure in adults has also been linked to increased risk of cardiovascular disease including heart attack. Some evidence also suggests that methylmercury can cause autoimmune effects in sensitive individuals. There is some evidence suggesting a possible connection between post-natal mercury exposure and autism; however, it is not clear whether methylmercury intake in particular is linked in a similar way. Although there is no doubt that methylmercury is toxic in several respects, including through exposure of the developing fetus, there is still some controversy as to the levels of methylmercury in the diet that can result in adverse effects. Recent evidence suggests that the developmental and cardiovascular toxicity of methylmercury may be mitigated by co-exposures to omega-3 fatty acids and perhaps selenium, both found in fish and elsewhere.

There have been several episodes in which large numbers of people were severely poisoned by food contaminated with high levels of methylmercury, notably the dumping of industrial waste that resulted in the pollution and subsequent mass poisoning in Minamata and Niigata, Japan and the situation in Iraq in the 1960s and 1970s in which wheat treated with methylmercury as a preservative and intended as seed grain was fed to animals and directly consumed by people (see Basra poison grain disaster). These episodes resulted in neurological symptoms including paresthesias, loss of physical coordination, difficulty in speech, narrowing of the visual field, hearing impairment, blindness, and death. Children who had been exposed in utero through their mothers' ingestion were also affected with a range of symptoms including motor difficulties, sensory problems and intellectual disability.

At present, exposures of this magnitude are rarely seen and are confined to isolated incidents. Accordingly, concern over methylmercury pollution is currently focused on more subtle effects that may be linked to levels of exposure presently seen in populations with high to moderate levels of dietary fish consumption. These effects are not necessarily identifiable on an individual level or may not be uniquely recognizable as due to methylmercury. However, such effects may be detected by comparing populations with different levels of exposure. There are isolated reports of various clinical health effects in individuals who consume large amounts of fish; however, the specific health effects and exposure patterns have not been verified with larger, controlled studies.

Many governmental agencies, the most notable ones being the United States Environmental Protection Agency (EPA), the United States Food and Drug Administration (FDA), Health Canada, and the European Union Health and Consumer Protection Directorate-General, as well as the World Health Organization (WHO) and the United Nations Food and Agriculture Organization (FAO), have issued guidance for fish consumers that is designed to limit methylmercury exposure from fish consumption. At present, most of this guidance is based on protection of the developing fetus; future guidance, however, may also address cardiovascular risk. In general, fish consumption advice attempts to convey the message that fish is a good source of nutrition and has significant health benefits, but that consumers, in particular pregnant women, women of child-bearing age, nursing mothers, and young children, should avoid fish with high levels of methylmercury, limit their intake of fish with moderate levels of methylmercury, and consume fish with low levels of methylmercury no more than twice a week.

=== Effects on fish and wildlife ===
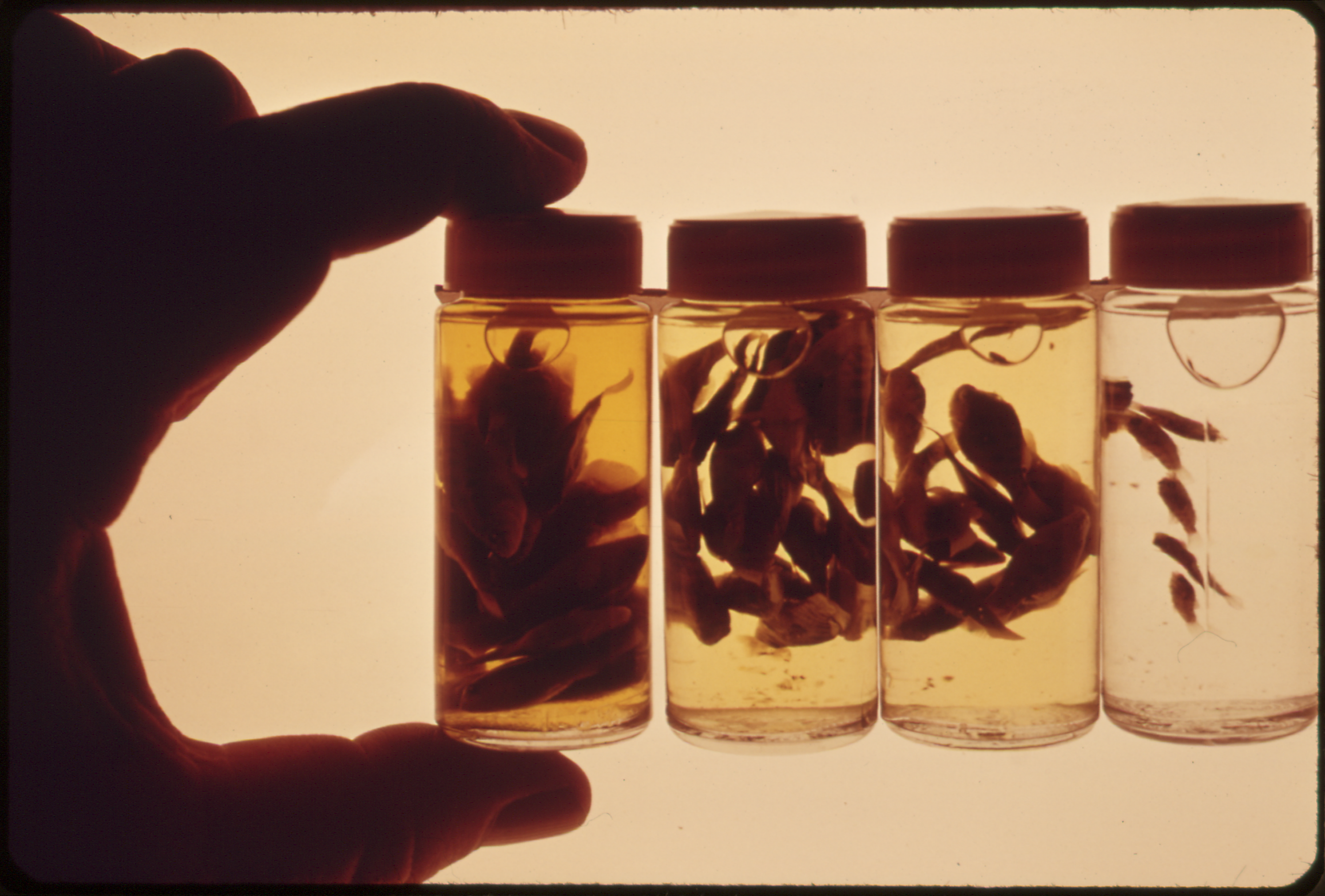
Four vials of larvae of Jordanella after one month in normal water for the first batch, and in water containing 0.6PPB and 1.26PPB and 2.5PPB (parts per billion) of methylmercury for the three bottles at right, respectively

MeHg is a highly toxic compound to wild fish, mammals and birds, and hazardous contaminant that affects the environmental habitat where it is encountered, making it hard to achieve good environmental status as defined by the Water Framework Directive (WFD).

In recent years, there has been increasing recognition that methylmercury affects fish and wildlife health, both in acutely polluted ecosystems and ecosystems with modest methylmercury levels. Two reviews document numerous studies of diminished reproductive success of fish, fish-eating birds, and mammals due to methylmercury contamination in aquatic ecosystems.

=== In public policy ===
Reported methylmercury levels in fish, along with fish consumption advisories, have the potential to disrupt people's eating habits, fishing traditions, and the livelihoods of the people involved in the capture, distribution, and preparation of fish as a foodstuff for humans. Furthermore, proposed limits on mercury emissions have the potential to add costly pollution controls on coal-fired utility boilers. Nevertheless, substantial benefits can be achieved globally by introducing mercury emission reduction measures because they reduce human and wildlife exposure to methylmercury.

About 30% of the distributed mercury depositional input is from current anthropogenic sources, and 70% is from natural sources. The natural sources category includes re-emission of mercury previously deposited from anthropogenic sources. According to one study, based on modeled concentrations, pre-Anthropocene tissue-bound levels in freshwater fish may not have differed markedly from current levels in some individual watersheds. However, based on a comprehensive set of global measurements, the ocean contains about 60,000 to 80,000 tons of mercury from pollution, and mercury levels in the upper ocean have tripled since the beginning of the industrial revolution. Higher mercury levels in shallower ocean waters could increase the amount of the toxicant accumulating in food fish, exposing people to a greater risk of mercury poisoning.

== Removal ==
=== From the environment ===
Methylmercury may be removed from an ecosystem by particle setting, absorption onto soil, and/or demethylation in drier wetland soils.

Several plant and phytoplankton species have the ability to demethylate methylmercury back into the inorganic form, which is subsequently reduced to the elemental form and enters the atmosphere as a vapor. This re-entrance could explain "why sharp declines in mercury emissions do not translate proportionally into reduced methylmercury exposure in humans".

=== From animal bodies ===
In a human physiologically based pharmacokinetic model, oral methylmercury is mainly detoxified by conversion to inorganic mercury in the gut (73% in adults, 61% in children); part of this comes from unabsorbed MeHg and the rest comes from excretion into the gut lumen by gut tissue. Another 13% in adults or 24% in children is excreted in the form of growing hair. Smaller amounts are biotransformed in the liver or eliminated unchanged through feces. The kidney largely does not participate in excretion through urination except at very high concentrations.

== See also ==
- Canadian Reference Materials include some with methylmercury, e.g. DORM
- Dimethylmercury, mercury with a second methyl group
- Ethylmercury, a related cation
- Mercury poisoning
- Mercury regulation in the United States
