= Gockel =

Gockel or Göckel is a surname. Notable people with the name include:

- Anja Gockel (born 1968), German fashion designer
- Eberhard Gockel (1636–1703), German physician
- Johann Gockel-Ehrlich (1896–1938), Austrian communist and activist
- Johannes Göckel (1886–1960), Dutch gymnast
- Paul Gockel (born 1965), Australian swimmer
- Rudolph Gockel (or Goclenius; 1547–1628), German scholastic philosopher
- Wolfgang Gockel (1945–2005), German archaeologist
- Sandra Gockel (born 1974), German politician
- Sigrid Metz-Göckel (1940–2025), German sociologist, political scientist and social psychologist
