= Blood lead level =

Level of lead in blood

Blood lead level (BLL) is a measure of the amount of lead in the blood. Lead is a toxic heavy metal and can cause neurological damage, especially among children, at any detectable level. High lead levels cause decreased vitamin D and haemoglobin synthesis as well as anemia, acute central nervous system disorders, and possibly death.

Pre-industrial human BLL measurements are estimated to have been 0.016 μg/dL, and this level increased markedly in the aftermath of the industrial revolution. At the end of the late 20th century, BLL measurements from remote human populations ranged from 0.8 to 3.2 μg/dL. Children in populations adjacent to industrial centers in developing countries often have average BLL measurements above 25 μg/dL. In the United States, the average blood level for children aged 1–5 years fell from 15.2 μg/dL in 1976–1980 to 0.83 μg/dL in 2011–2016, a change largely attributed to phasing out leaded gasoline.

No level of lead in the blood of children is currently thought to be safe, but in 2021, the US Centers for Disease Control and Prevention (CDC) identified 3.5 μg/dL as the blood lead level of concern in children which should prompt further medical investigation. Approximately 2.5% of American children have at least this much lead in their blood.

== Measurement ==
Measuring a person's blood lead level requires a blood sample, which may be performed with a fingerstick or a blood draw.

The amount of lead found in the blood sample may be measured in micrograms of lead per deciliter of blood (μg/dL) especially in the United States; 5 μg/dL is equivalent to 0.24 μmol/L (micromolar).

BLL cannot measure long-term lead exposure. An x-ray fluorescence test provides measurements from the bone because lead is predominantly stored in the human body in calcified tissues such as bones.

== No safe level ==
The Centers for Disease Control and Prevention (CDC) changed its view on blood lead levels in 2012 because of "a growing body of studies concluding that blood lead levels (BLLs) lower than 10 μg/dL harm children" with "irreversible" effects, and "since no safe blood lead level in children has been identified, a blood lead 'level of concern' cannot be used to define individuals in need of intervention". The new policy is to aim to reduce average blood lead levels in US children to as low a level as possible.

The CDC now publishes a "reference" blood lead level which they hope can decrease in coming years. The reference value is "based on the 97.5th percentile of the BLL distribution among children 1–5 years old in the United States". As of 2021, the value is set at 3.5 μg/dL. It is not a level deemed by the CDC as "safe". The reference level is designed to be used as a policy tool. Parents, clinicians, communities, state and federal authorities and political leaders are expected to monitor blood lead test levels, aware that children testing higher than the reference level are testing higher than 97.5% of all US children. The CDC expects action to be taken when test levels are found to exceed the reference. As blood lead levels slowly decline in response to such action, the reference will also decline. CDC will recalculate a new reference every four years.

== Historical trends ==
Prior to the industrial revolution human BLL is estimated to have been far less than it is today. Bone lead measurements from two Native American populations living on the Pacific coast and the Colorado River between 1000 and 1300 AD show that BLLs would have been approximately 0.016 μg/dL. The World Health Organization and others interpret these measurements to be broadly representative of human preindustrial BLL.

Contemporary human BLLs in remote locations are estimated to be 0.8 and 3.2 μg/dL in the southern and northern hemispheres, respectively. Blood lead levels 50 to 1,000 times higher than preindustrial levels are commonly measured in contemporary human populations around the world. The National Academies evaluated this issue in 1991 and confirmed that the blood lead level of the average person in the US was 300 to 500 times higher than that of pre-industrial humans.

Clair Patterson originally developed techniques to measure tiny concentrations of lead in his quest to determine the age of Earth. When he discovered that preindustrial humans had far less lead in their bodies than all modern humans, he wrote: "It seems probable that persons polluted with amounts of lead that are at least 400 times higher than natural levels, and are nearly one-third to one-half that required to induce dysfunction, that their lives are being adversely affected by loss of mental acuity and irrationality. This would apply to most people in the United States".

== Demographic and geographic patterns ==
Blood lead levels are highest in countries where lead is added to petrol or gasoline, where lead is used in paint or soldered products, in urban areas, in areas adjacent to high road traffic, and in developing countries. In Jamaica, 44% of children living near lead production facilities had BLLs above 25 μg/dL. In Albania, 98% of preschool children and 82% of schoolchildren had BLLs above 10 μg/dL; preschoolers living near a battery factory had average BLLs of 43 μg/dL. In China, 50% of children living in rural areas had BLLs above 10 μg/dL, and children living near sites of industry and high traffic had average BLLs ranging from 22 to 68 μg/dL.

BLL measurements from developed countries decreased markedly beginning in the late 1970s, when restrictions were placed upon lead use in gasoline, petrol, paint, soldering material and other products. In the United States, average BLLs measured among tens of thousands of subjects declined from 12.8 to 2.8 μg/dL between 1976 and 1991. In the 1990s, BLLs of children in Australia were measured to be 5 μg/dL, and 9 μg/dL in Barcelona, Spain.

In the United States, blood lead levels remain highest for children, for people in urban centers, for people of lower socioeconomic status, and for minorities.

After the phasing out of leaded gasoline in China, blood lead levels of children in that country now appear to be associated with coal consumption. "Coal consumption fly ash is a dominant source of lead exposure to children in Shanghai." As of 2009, coal combustion was considered to be an important source of Pb air pollution in China, the eastern U.S., and to some extent, in Europe.

== Sources of lead ==
Exposure to lead occurs through ingestion, inhalation, and dermal contact. Lead enters the bloodstream through exposure and elevates blood lead level that may result in lead poisoning or an elevated blood lead level. For example, a child can ingest lead by chewing on a toy that is made of lead-contaminated metal or is painted with lead-contaminated paint.

A major source of exposure to lead comes from inhalation. Factories and industries, vehicle exhaust (especially from vehicles using leaded gasoline), and even dust in the air that people breathe all have the potential of containing lead. Other major sources of lead exposure include ingestion and contact with products such as paint and soil that may contain lead. Many older claw-foot bathtubs have also been found to leach lead, especially when filled with warm bath water.

Environmental exposure to lead is not the only source of lead-related health effects. Many industrial workers in the United States have potential occupational exposure to lead, and lead poisoning is still seen at occupational health clinics. Other known occupations include shipbuilding, painting, battery making, and fire range instruction and cleaning.

== Health effects ==
The Centers for Disease Control and Prevention (CDC) states "No safe blood lead level in children has been identified. Even low levels of lead in blood have been shown to affect IQ, ability to pay attention, and academic achievement. Effects of lead exposure cannot be corrected". "The absence of an identified BLL without deleterious effects, combined with the evidence that these effects appear to be irreversible, underscores the critical importance of primary prevention."

The most sensitive populations are infants, children, and pregnant women.

A child can drink a glass of water containing lead and absorb 50% of it. An adult might only retain 10% of the lead in that water. And once the lead is in the child's body, it reaches the brain through the not fully developed blood brain barrier. The body removes lead from blood and stores it in bone, but in children it subsequently leaves the bone more readily compared to adults. "Lead that has accumulated in a woman's bones is removed from her bones and passes freely from mother to child; maternal and fetal blood lead levels are virtually identical. Once in the fetal circulation, lead readily enters the developing brain through the immature blood–brain barrier".

"Lead is associated with a wide range of toxicity in children across a very broad band of exposures, down to the lowest blood lead concentrations yet studied, both in animals and people. These toxic effects extend from acute, clinically obvious, symptomatic poisoning at high levels of exposure down to subclinical (but still very damaging) effects at lower levels. Lead poisoning can affect virtually every organ system in the body. The principal organs affected are the central and peripheral nervous system and the cardiovascular, gastrointestinal, renal, endocrine, immune and haematological systems".

Adults who are exposed to a dangerous amount of lead can experience anemia, nervous system dysfunction, weakness, hypertension, kidney problems, decreased fertility, an increased level of miscarriages, premature deliveries, and low birth weight of their child.

A 2018 study in the American Economic Journal: Applied Economics found that for Rhode Island children born 1997–2005 (and therefore exposed to historically low levels of lead), "a one-unit decrease in average blood lead levels reduces the probability of being substantially below proficient in reading (math) by 0.96 (0.79) percentage points on a baseline of 12 (16) percent."

A 2020 study that looked at the phasing-out of leaded gasoline in Sweden and used extensive administrative data to track 800,000 Swedish children into adulthood found that even low levels of lead adversely affected the cognitive abilities of children. The study found that the children who were not exposed to leaded gasoline had 5% higher yearly earnings as adults than the children who were exposed.

== See also ==
- Acceptable daily intake
- Adult Blood Lead Epidemiology and Surveillance
- Lead abatement
