= Lead poisoning =

Poisoning caused by lead in the body

- Other names: Plumbism, colica pictorum, saturnism, Devon colic, painter's colic.
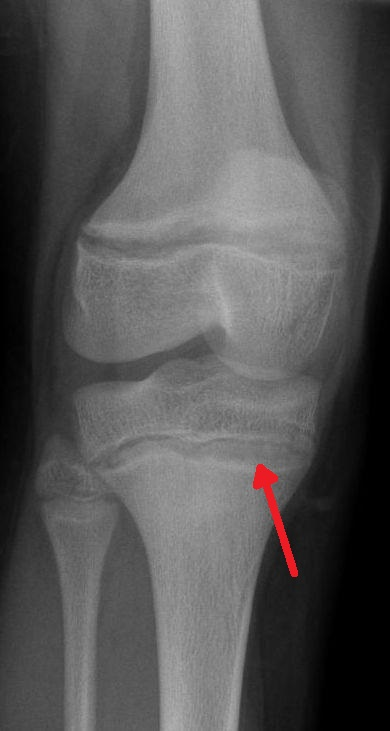
- An X-ray demonstrating the characteristic finding of lead poisoning in humans—dense metaphyseal lines.
- Specialty: Toxicology
- Symptoms: Intellectual disability, abdominal pain, constipation, headaches, irritability, memory problems, inability to have children, tingling in the hands and feet.
- Complications: Anemia, seizures, coma.
- Causes: Exposure to lead via contaminated air, water, dust, food, consumer products.
- Risk factors: Young age, pica.
- Diagnostic method: Blood lead level
- Differential diagnosis: Iron deficiency anemia, malabsorption, ADHD, anxiety disorder, polyneuropathy
- Prevention: Removing lead from the home, improved monitoring and education in the workplace, laws that ban lead in products.
- Treatment: Chelation therapy
- Medication: Dimercaprol, edetate calcium disodium, succimer.
- Frequency: 0.005%
- Deaths: 5.5 million deaths per year (as of 2019)

Lead poisoning, also known as plumbism and saturnism, is a type of metal poisoning caused by the presence of lead in the human body. Symptoms of lead poisoning may include abdominal pain, constipation, headaches, irritability, memory problems, infertility, numbness and tingling in the hands and feet. Some of the effects are permanent. In severe cases, anemia, seizures, coma, or death may occur. Chronic lead poisoning occurs due to prolonged exposure.

Exposure to lead can occur through contaminated air, water, dust, food, or consumer products. Lead poisoning poses a significantly increased risk to children and pets as they are far more likely to ingest lead indirectly by chewing on toys or other objects that are coated in lead paint. Additionally, children absorb greater quantities of lead from ingested sources than adults. Exposure at work is a common cause of lead poisoning in adults, with certain occupations at particular risk. Diagnosis is typically by measurement of the blood lead level. The Centers for Disease Control and Prevention (US) has set the upper limit for blood lead for adults at 10 μg/dL (10 μg/100 g) and for children at 3.5 μg/dL; before October 2021 the limit for children was 5 μg/dL. Elevated lead may also be detected by changes in red blood cells or dense lines in the bones of children as seen on X-ray.

Lead poisoning is preventable. Prevention strategies include individual efforts such as removing lead-containing items from the home, workplace efforts such as improved ventilation and monitoring, state and national policies that ban lead in consumer products such as paint, gasoline, ammunition, wheel weights, and fishing weights, reduce allowable levels in water or soil, and provide for cleanup of contaminated soil. Workers' education could be helpful as well. The major treatments are removal of the source of lead and the use of medications that bind lead so it can be eliminated from the body, known as chelation therapy. Chelation therapy in children is recommended when blood levels are greater than 40–45 μg/dL. Medications used include dimercaprol, edetate calcium disodium, and succimer.

With chronic lead poisoning causing millions of deaths per year and brain damage in millions of children, the burden of lead poisoning on the worldwide population is immense. The World Health Organization has described chronic lead exposure and poisoning as a worldwide public health emergency, with urgent interventions needed to reduce exposure to lead and improving health systems' capicity to screen for and treat lead poisoning. In 2019, 5.5 million deaths worldwide were attributed to cardiovascular disease caused by lead poisoning. Chronic lead poisoning is a leading contributor to intellectual disability, learning disabilites, and behavioral problems in children. Lead poisoning causes an estimated 30% of intellectual disability of otherwise unknown cause. Every year, lead poisoning causes a loss of 765 million IQ points in children. The global disease burden of deaths from lead poisoning and intellectual disabilities in children was estimated at 6.0 trillion dollars during 2019 (or 7% of the worldwide gross domestic product).

Lead poisoning occurs most commonly in the developing world. An estimated 800 million children have blood lead levels over 5 μg/dL in low- and middle-income nations, though comprehensive public health data remains inadequate. Those who are poor are at greater risk. Lead is believed to result in 0.6% of the world's disease burden. Globally, over 15% of children are known to have blood lead levels (BLL) of over 10 μg/dL, at which point clinical intervention is strongly indicated.

People have been mining and using lead for thousands of years. Descriptions of lead poisoning date to at least 200 BC, while efforts to limit lead's use date back to at least the 16th century. Human exposure to lead increased significantly during the 20th century, when industrialization led to lead being used in a variety of industrial processes and household products. Public health efforts to limit exposure to lead began in the 1970s, when it became understood that due to its bioaccumulative nature, there was no safe threshold for lead exposure. Humans have 100 times more lead in their bodies as compared to humans in pre-industrialized times. However, efforts to reduce lead exposure (such as the worldwide banning of leaded gasoline) have led to a 95% reduction in humans' lead levels since the 1970s in some countries (such as the United States).

== Classification ==
Classically, "lead poisoning" or "lead intoxication" has been defined as exposure to high levels of lead, typically associated with severe health effects. Poisoning is a pattern of symptoms that occur with toxic effects from mid to high levels of exposure; toxicity is a wider spectrum of effects, including subclinical ones (those that do not cause symptoms). However, professionals often use "lead poisoning" and "lead toxicity" interchangeably, and official sources do not always restrict the use of "lead poisoning" to refer only to symptomatic effects of lead.

The amount of lead in the blood and tissues, as well as the time course of exposure, determine toxicity. Lead poisoning may be acute (from intense exposure of short duration) or chronic (from repeated low-level exposure over a prolonged period), but the latter is much more common. Diagnosis and treatment of lead exposure are based on blood lead level (the amount of lead in the blood), measured in micrograms of lead per deciliter of blood (μg/dL). Urine lead levels may be used, though less commonly.

The US Centers for Disease Control and Prevention and the World Health Organization state that a blood lead level of 10 μg/dL or above is a cause for concern; however, lead may impair development and have harmful health effects even at lower levels, and there is no known safe exposure level. Authorities such as the American Academy of Pediatrics define lead poisoning as blood lead levels higher than 10 μg/dL.

== Signs and symptoms ==
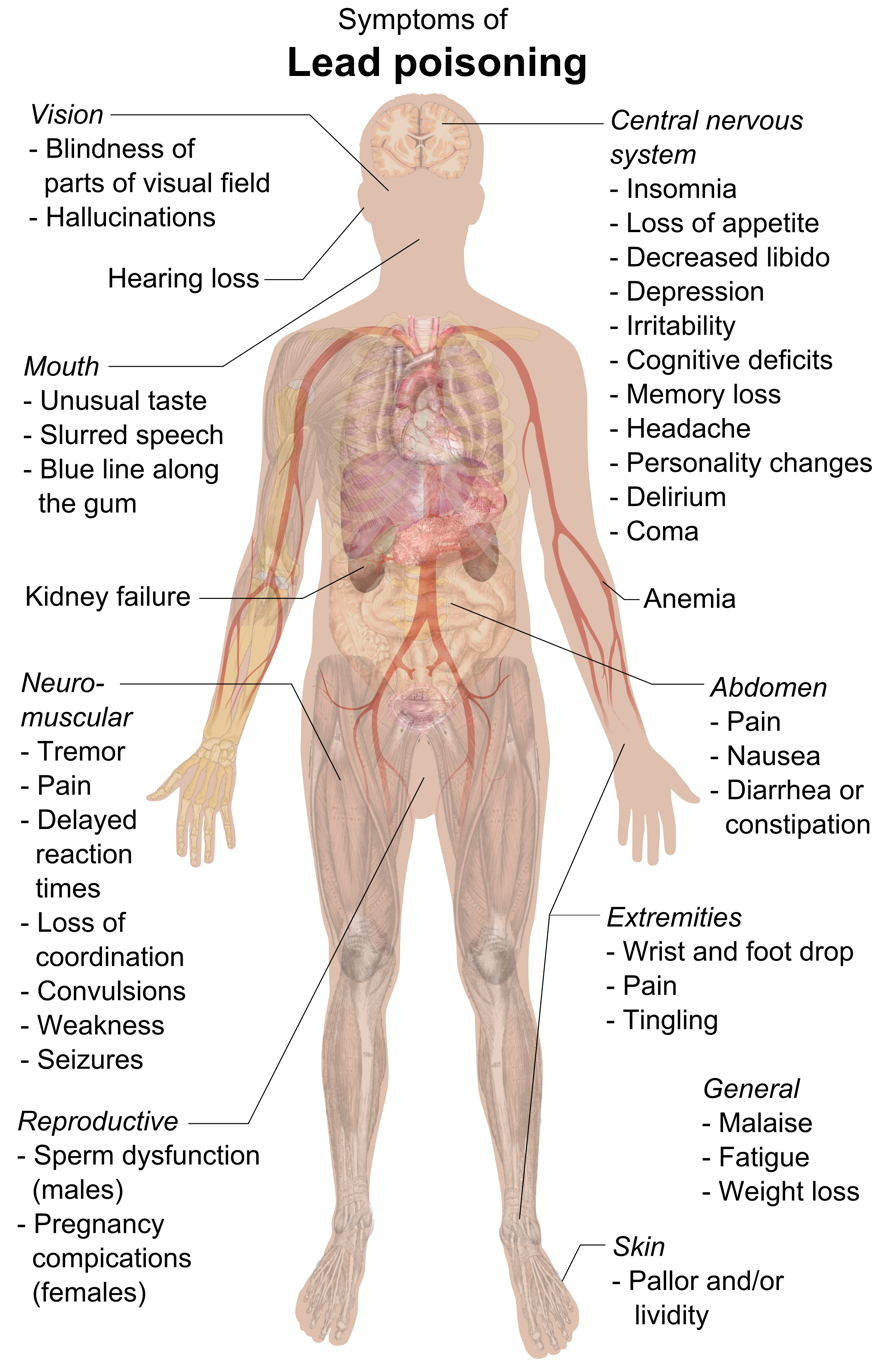
Symptoms of lead poisoning.

Lead poisoning can cause a variety of symptoms and signs which vary depending on the individual and the duration of lead exposure. Symptoms are nonspecific and may be subtle, and someone with elevated lead levels may have no symptoms. Symptoms usually develop over weeks to months as lead builds up in the body during a chronic exposure, but acute symptoms from brief, intense exposures also occur. Symptoms from exposure to organic lead, which is probably more toxic than inorganic lead due to its lipid solubility, occur rapidly. Poisoning by organic lead compounds has symptoms predominantly in the central nervous system, such as insomnia, delirium, cognitive deficits, tremor, hallucinations, and convulsions.

Symptoms may be different in adults and children; the main symptoms in adults are headache, abdominal pain, memory loss, kidney failure, male reproductive problems, and weakness, pain, or tingling in the extremities.

Early symptoms of lead poisoning in adults are commonly nonspecific and include depression, loss of appetite, intermittent abdominal pain, nausea, diarrhea, constipation, and muscle pain. Other early signs in adults include malaise, fatigue, decreased libido, and problems with sleep. An unusual taste in the mouth and personality changes are also early signs.

In adults, symptoms can occur at levels above 40 μg/dL, but are more likely to occur only above 50–60 μg/dL. Symptoms begin to appear in children generally at around 60 μg/dL. However, the lead levels at which symptoms appear vary widely depending on unknown characteristics of each individual. At blood lead levels between 25 and 60 μg/dL, neuropsychiatric effects such as delayed reaction times, irritability, and difficulty concentrating, as well as slowed motor nerve conduction and headache can occur. Anemia may appear at blood lead levels higher than 50 μg/dL. In adults, abdominal colic, involving paroxysms of pain, may appear at blood lead levels greater than 80 μg/dL. Signs that occur in adults at blood lead levels exceeding 100 μg/dL include wrist drop and foot drop, and signs of encephalopathy (a condition characterized by brain swelling), such as those that accompany increased pressure within the skull, delirium, coma, seizures, and headache. In children, signs of encephalopathy such as bizarre behavior, discoordination, and apathy occur at lead levels exceeding 70 μg/dL. For both adults and children, it is rare to be asymptomatic if blood lead levels exceed 100 μg/dL.

=== Acute poisoning ===
In acute poisoning, typical neurological signs are pain, muscle weakness, numbness and tingling, and, rarely, symptoms associated with inflammation of the brain. Abdominal pain, nausea, vomiting, diarrhea, and constipation are other acute symptoms. Lead's effects on the mouth include astringency and a metallic taste. Gastrointestinal problems, such as constipation, diarrhea, poor appetite, or weight loss, are common in acute poisoning. Absorption of large amounts of lead over a short time can cause shock (insufficient fluid in the circulatory system) due to loss of water from the gastrointestinal tract. Hemolysis (the rupture of red blood cells) due to acute poisoning can cause anemia and hemoglobin in the urine. Damage to kidneys can cause changes in urination such as acquired Fanconi syndrome and decreased urine output. People who survive acute poisoning often go on to display symptoms of chronic poisoning.

=== Chronic poisoning ===
Chronic lead poisoning is due to prolonged, generally low level, exposure to lead over months to years causing lead to accumulate in the body. Chronic poisoning usually presents with symptoms affecting multiple organ systems including the gastrointestinal, muscular, cardiovascular, and neurological systems. Signs of chronic exposure include cardiovascular disease (with a higher risk of heart disease and heart attack), neurological dysfunction (including intellectual disabilities in children and cognitive impairment in adults), hypertension (high blood pressure), kidney disease, pre-term births or pregnancy complications, and anti-social criminal behaviors. A "lead hue" of the skin with pallor and/or lividity is another feature. A blue line along the gum with bluish black edging to the teeth, known as a Burton line, is another indication of chronic lead poisoning. Children with chronic poisoning may refuse to play or may have hyperkinetic or aggressive behavior disorders.

=== Effects on pregnancy and children ===
As lead safety standards become more stringent, substantially fewer children in the US are found to have elevated lead levels.

Pregnant women who have elevated blood lead levels are at greater risk of premature birth or a low birth weight. In a Canadian prospective population based cohort study, an increase in blood lead levels in pregnant women by 10 μg/L was associated with a 70% increased risk of preterm birth. In the same study, in those with low vitamin D levels, lead toxicity was associated with an even greater risk of preterm birth, a 3 times higher risk.

Children are at greater risk for lead poisoning because their smaller bodies are in a continuous state of growth and development, and their bodies therefore absorb lead from the environment at a greater rate than adults. Young children usually absorb 4 to 5 times more lead than an adult from a given source. Younger children also crawl on the floor and explore objects and fixtures with their mouths and therefore more prone to ingesting and inhaling dust that is contaminated with lead.

The classic signs and symptoms in children are loss of appetite, abdominal pain, vomiting, weight loss, constipation, anemia, kidney failure, irritability, lethargy, learning disabilities, and behavioral problems.

Chronic lead exposure is associated with developmental delay, intellectual disability, learning difficulties, poor academic performance, and behavioral problems in children. Chronic lead exposure is also a risk factor for attention deficit hyperactivity disorder (ADHD) in children. Children with lead poisoning are 7.4 times more likely of dropping out of school and 5.8 times more likely of having learning disabilities. Lead poisoning is also a risk factor for behavioral problems in children including conduct disorder, delinquincy, and criminal behavior. In children with chronic lead exposure, the largest rate of decline in the intelligence quotient (IQ) was at lower relative lead levels (less than 100 μg/L) with the decline continuing at higher levels, but at a less rapid rate.

Although less common, fingernails can develop leukonychia striata if exposed to abnormally high lead concentrations.

On July 30, 2020, a report by UNICEF and Pure Earth revealed that lead poisoning is affecting children on a "massive and previously unknown scale". According to the report, one in three children, up to 800 million globally, have blood lead levels at or above 5 micrograms per decilitre (μg/dL), which is the commonly accepted threshold beyond which treatment is required.

=== By organ system ===
Lead affects every one of the body's organ systems, especially the nervous system, but also the bones and teeth, the kidneys, and the cardiovascular, immune, and reproductive systems. Hearing loss and tooth decay have been linked to lead exposure, as have cataracts. Intrauterine and neonatal lead exposure promote tooth decay. Aside from the developmental effects unique to young children, the health effects experienced by adults are similar to those in children, although the thresholds are generally higher.

==== Kidneys ====
Kidney damage may occur with exposure to lead. The toxic effects of lead cause damage to the proximal tubule of the kidney as lead deposits in the cells, this may cause Fanconi syndrome, in which the proximal tubular function of the kidney is impaired. Chronic lead exposure can also case fibrosis or scarring of the kidney tubules. Those with chronic kidney disease or with risk factors such as hypertension or diabetes mellitus are at increased risk of worsening kidney disease due to chronic lead exposure.

In a population based study based on the NHANES population in the United States from 1999 to 2006, those with blood lead levels greater than 24 μg/L were 56% more likely to have chronic kidney disease. And in a prospective cohort study, lead blood levels above 33 μg/L were associated with a 49% increased risk of developing chronic kidney disease.

Lead poisoning inhibits excretion of the waste product urate and causes a predisposition for gout, in which urate builds up. This condition is known as saturnine gout.

==== Cardiovascular system ====
Chronic lead exposure is a strong risk factor for coronary heart disease and cardiovascular disease, including atherosclerosis (damage and hardening of the artieral walls throghout the body with plaques forming in the walls and restricting blood flow). Lead can accumulate in artieral walls causing damage consistent with atherosclerosis. Chronic lead poisoning is associated with a higher risk of death from heart disease. Chronic lead exposure leads to oxidative stress, reduction of nitric oxide levels (nitric oxide is a vasodilator in the body), production of protein kinase C (which is a vasoconstrictor), hydrogen peroxide formation, thrombosis (formation of blood clots), damage to the endothelial cells lining blood vessels, with microtears of the lining of blood vessels; all of which contribute to atherosclerosis and heart disease.

Chronic lead exposure in adults (as measured by an increase in lead levels by 10 μg/L) is associated with an 1.24 times increased risk of severe coronary artery calcifications. In a population based study of the NHANES population from 1988 to 1994, increased lead levels from the 10th to the 90th percentile was associated with a 2 times risk of death from coronary heart disease. As body lead levels increase from 0 to 50 μg/L, the risk of death from coronary heart disease and cardiovascular disease increases linearly, with the risk of death increasing more slowly at higher lead levels (above 50 μg/L).

Evidence suggests lead exposure is associated with high blood pressure. In the Strong Heart Study of Native Americans, reducing lead levels by 9 μg/L or more was associated with a decline in blood pressure by 7.1 mmHg.

People who have been exposed to higher concentrations of lead may be at a higher risk for cardiac autonomic dysfunction on days when ozone and fine particles are higher.

The duration of lead exposure needed to cause hypertension and heart disease is not well understood. Reducing body lead levels (as with chelation therapy) usually lowers the risk of cardiovascular disease in 1-2 years.

==== Reproductive system ====
Lead affects both the male and female reproductive systems. In men, when blood lead levels exceed 40 μg/dL, sperm count is reduced and changes occur in volume of sperm, their motility, and their morphology. A pregnant woman's elevated blood lead level can lead to miscarriage, prematurity, low birth weight, and problems with development during childhood. Lead can pass through the placenta and into breast milk, and blood lead levels in mothers and infants are usually similar. A fetus may be poisoned in utero if lead from the mother's bones is subsequently mobilized by the changes in metabolism due to pregnancy; increased calcium intake in pregnancy may help mitigate this phenomenon.

==== Nervous system ====
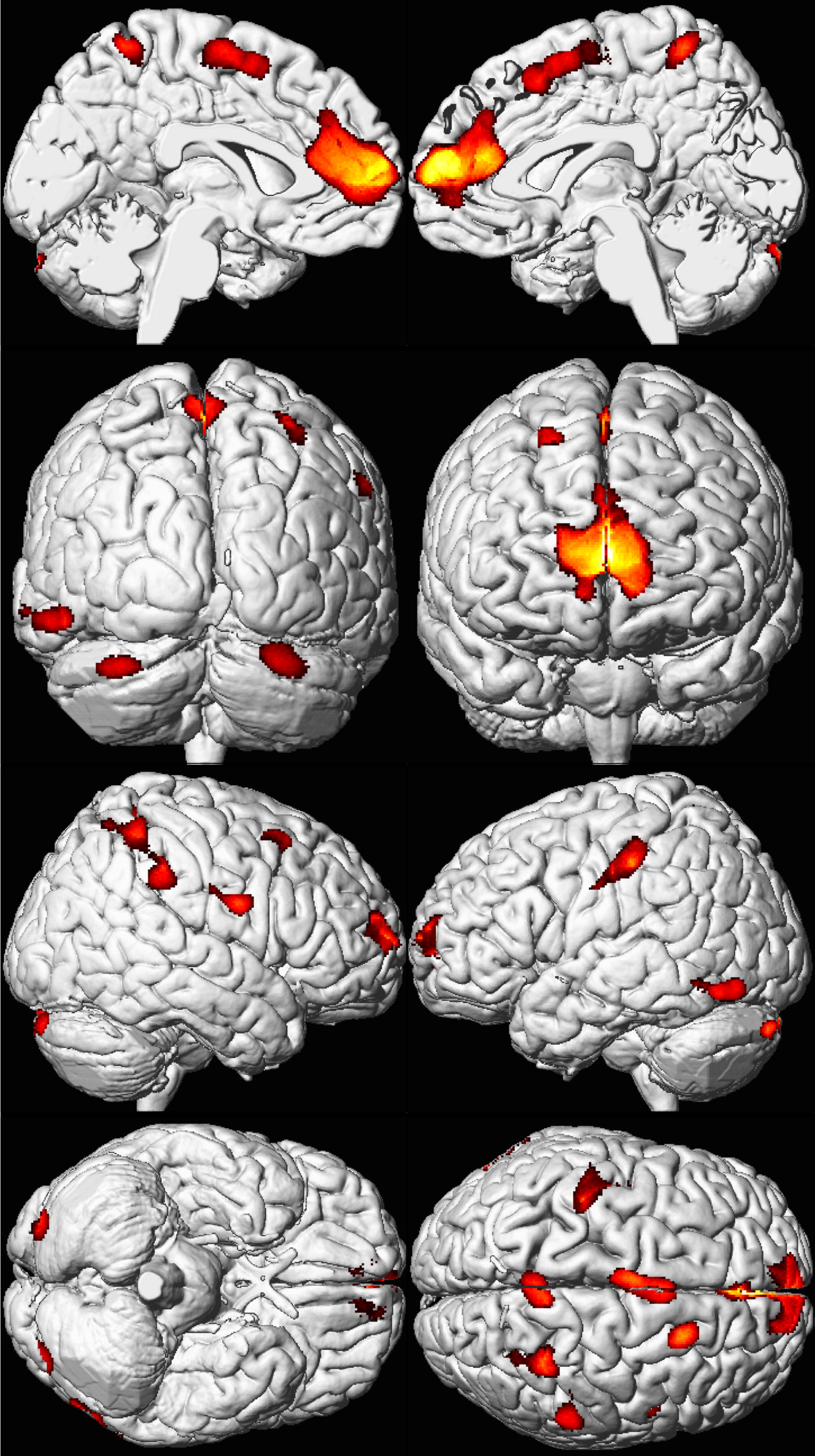
The brains of adults who were exposed to lead as children show decreased volume, especially in the prefrontal cortex, on MRI. Areas of volume loss are shown in color over a template of a normal brain.

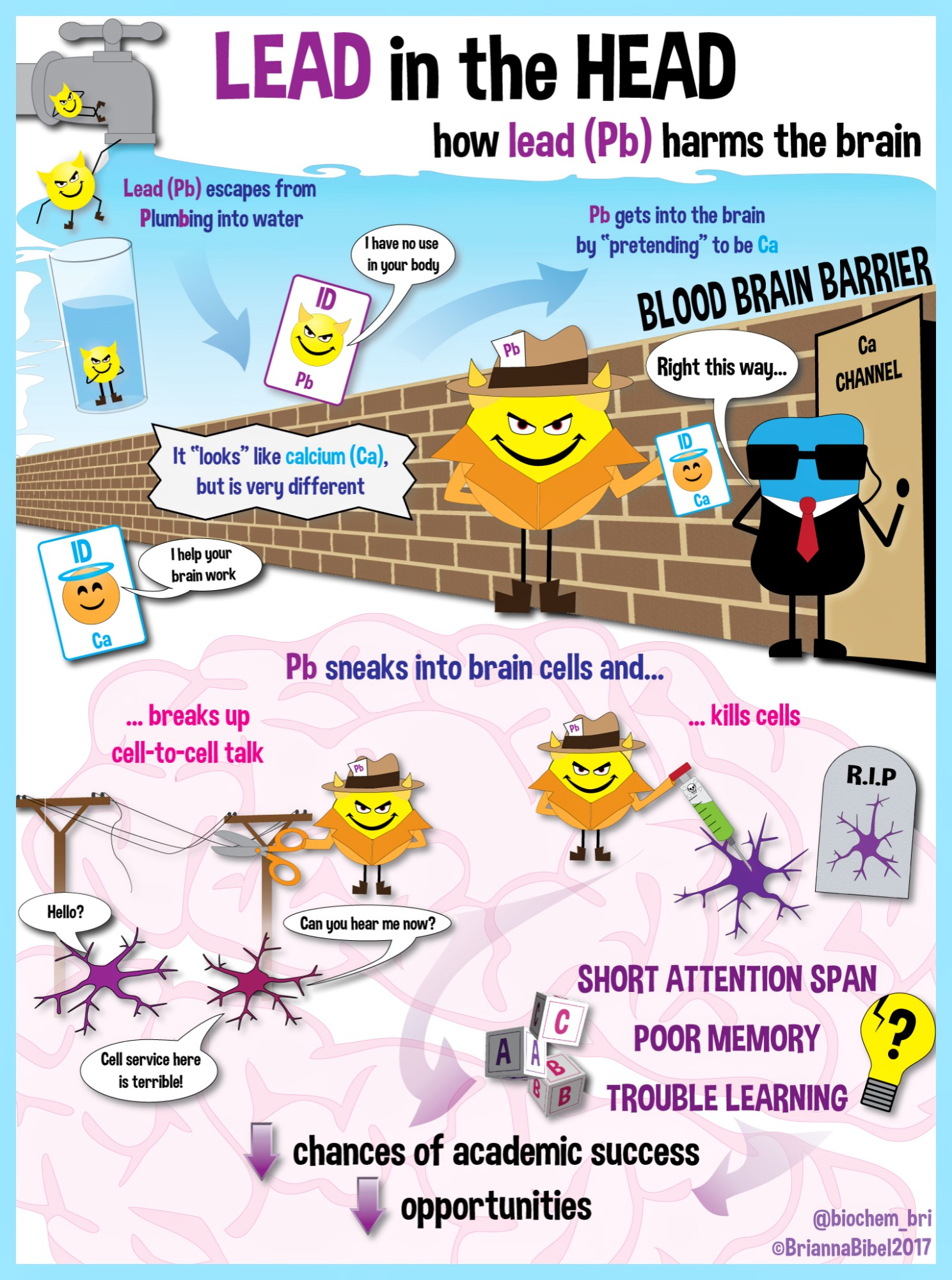
An infographic explaining lead poisoning.

Lead affects the peripheral nervous system (especially motor nerves) and the central nervous system. Peripheral nervous system effects are more prominent in adults, and central nervous system effects are more prominent in children. Lead causes the axons of nerve cells to degenerate and lose their myelin coats.

Lead exposure in young children has been linked to learning disabilities, and children with blood lead concentrations greater than 10 μg/dL are in danger of developmental disabilities. Increased blood lead level in children has been correlated with decreases in intelligence, nonverbal reasoning, short-term memory, attention, reading and arithmetic ability, fine motor skills, emotional regulation, and social engagement.

The effect of lead on children's cognitive abilities takes place at very low levels. There is no apparent lower threshold to the dose-response relationship (unlike other heavy metals such as mercury) and even very low levels of lead in the body are dangerous to a child's development. Reduced academic performance has been associated with lead exposure even at blood lead levels lower than 5 μg/dL. Blood lead levels below 10 μg/dL have been reported to be associated with lower IQ and behavior problems such as aggression, in proportion with blood lead levels. Between the blood lead levels of 5 and 35 μg/dL, an IQ decrease of 2–4 points for each μg/dL increase is reported in children. However, studies that show associations between low-level lead exposure and health effects in children may be affected by confounding and overestimate the effects of low-level lead exposure.

Lead exposure in children is also correlated with neuropsychiatric disorders such as attention deficit hyperactivity disorder and anti-social behaviour. Elevated lead levels in children are correlated with higher scores on aggression and delinquency measures. A correlation has also been found between prenatal and early childhood lead exposure and violent crime in adulthood. Countries with the highest air lead levels have also been found to have the highest murder rates, after adjusting for confounding factors. A May 2000 study by economic consultant Rick Nevin theorizes that lead exposure explains 65% to 90% of the variation in violent crime rates in the US. A 2007 paper by the same author claims to show a strong association between preschool blood lead and subsequent crime rate trends over several decades across nine countries. Lead exposure in childhood appears to increase school suspensions and juvenile detention among boys. It is believed that the US ban on lead paint in buildings in the late 1970s, as well as the phaseout of leaded gasoline in the 1970s and 1980s, partially helped contribute to the decline of violent crime in the United States since the early 1990s.

High blood lead levels in adults are also associated with decreases in cognitive performance and with psychiatric symptoms such as depression and anxiety. It was found in a large group of current and former inorganic lead workers in Korea that blood lead levels in the range of 20–50 μg/dL were correlated with neuro-cognitive defects. Increases in blood lead levels from about 50 to about 100 μg/dL in adults are associated with persistent, and possibly permanent, impairment of central nervous system function. In adults, chronic lead exposure was associated with a reduced brain mass and cognitive decline (especially in those with the ApoE4 genetic allele, which is a risk factor for dementia).

== Exposure routes ==
Lead is a common environmental pollutant. Causes of environmental contamination include lead-based paint that is deteriorating (e.g. peeling, chipping, chalking, cracking, damp or damage), renovation, repair or painting activities (disturbing or demolishing painted surfaces generate toxic lead dust), industrial use of lead, such as found in facilities that process lead-acid batteries or produce lead wire or pipes, metal recycling and foundries, and burning of joss paper. Storage batteries and ammunition are made with the largest amounts of lead consumed in the economy each year, in the US as of 2013. Children living near facilities that process lead, such as lead smelters, have been found to have unusually high blood lead levels. In August 2009, parents rioted in China after lead poisoning was found in nearly 2000 children living near zinc and manganese smelters. Lead exposure can occur from contact with lead in air, household dust, soil, water, and commercial products. Leaded gasoline has also been linked to increases in lead pollution. Some research has suggested a link between leaded gasoline and crime rates. Man-made lead pollution has been elevated in the air for the past 2000 years. Lead pollution in the air is entirely due to human activity (mining and smelting, as well as in gasoline).

=== Occupational exposure ===
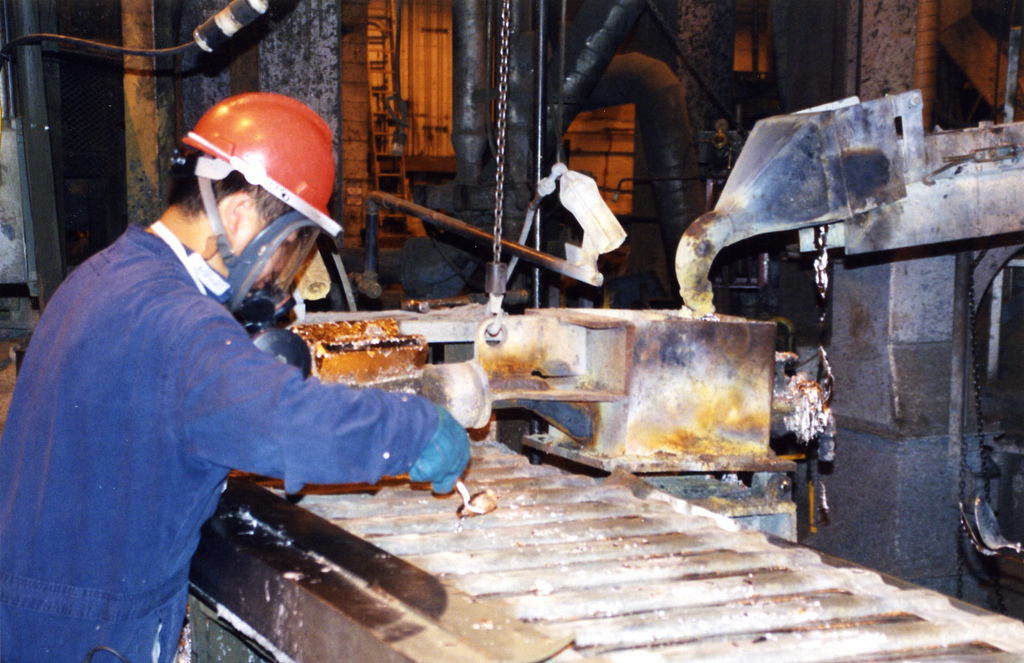
Battery recycling workers are at risk for lead exposure. This worker ladles molten lead into billets in a lead-acid battery recovery facility.

In adults, occupational exposure is the main cause of lead poisoning. People can be exposed when working in facilities that produce a variety of lead-containing products; these include radiation shields, ammunition, certain surgical equipment, developing dental X-ray films prior to digital X-rays (each film packet had a lead liner to prevent the radiation from going through), fetal monitors, plumbing, circuit boards, jet engines, and ceramic glazes. In addition, lead miners and smelters, plumbers and fitters, auto mechanics, glass manufacturers, construction workers, battery manufacturer and recyclers, firing range workers, and plastic manufacturers are at risk for lead exposure. Other occupations that present lead exposure risks include welding, manufacture of rubber, printing, zinc and copper smelting, processing of ore, combustion of solid waste, and production of paints and pigments. Lead exposure can also occur with intense use of gun ranges, regardless of whether these ranges are indoor or out. Parents who are exposed to lead in the workplace can bring lead dust home on clothes or skin and expose their children. Occupational exposure to lead increases the risk of cardiovascular disease, in particular: stroke, and high blood pressure.

=== Food ===
Lead may be found in food when food is grown in soil that is high in lead, airborne lead contaminates the crops, animals eat lead in their diet, or lead enters the food either from what it was stored or cooked in. Ingestion of lead paint and batteries is also a route of exposure for livestock, which can subsequently affect humans. Milk produced by contaminated cattle can be diluted to a lower lead concentration and sold for consumption.

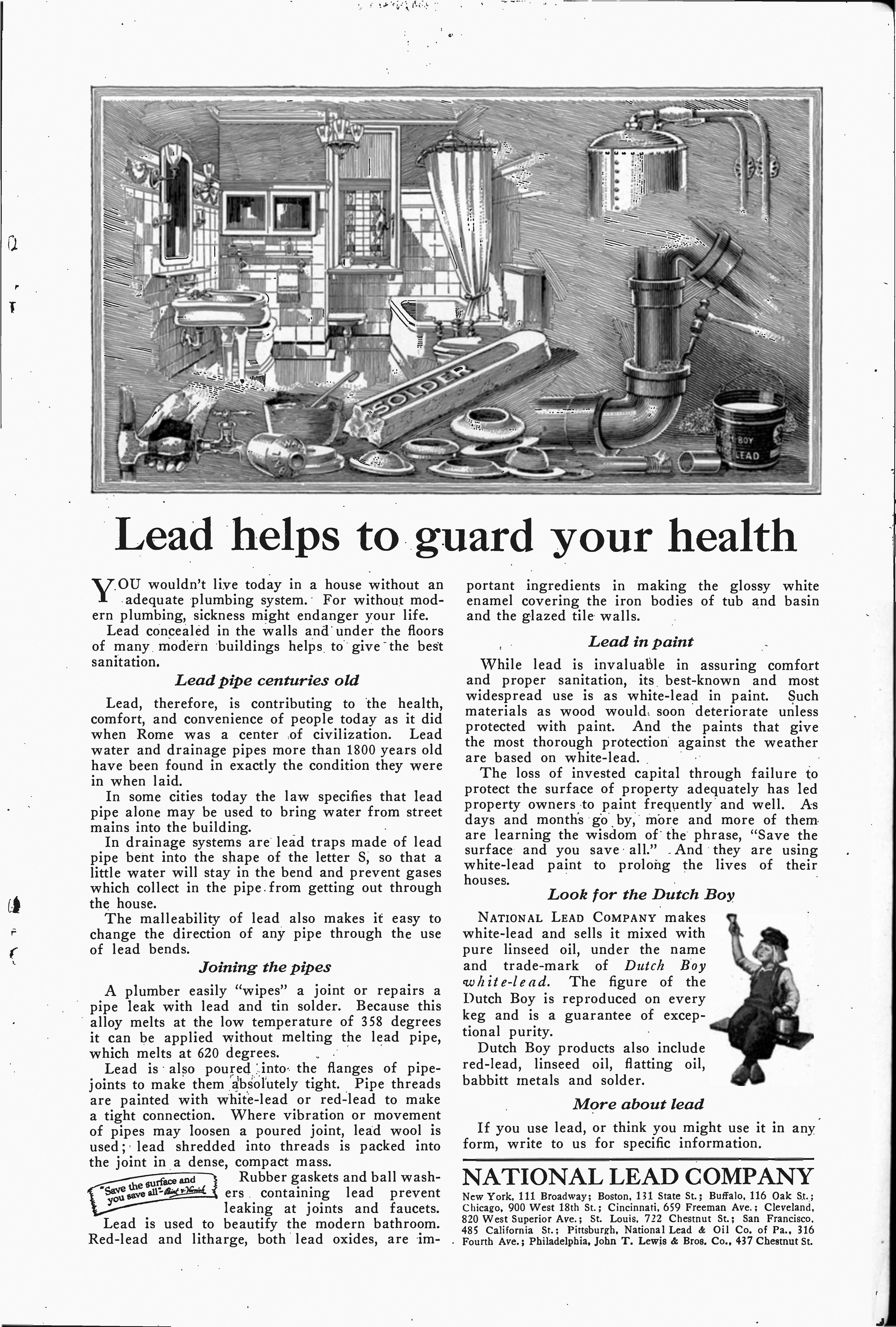
Advertisement for lead (Pb) appearing on the 175th page of the November, 1923 issue of National Geographic.

In Bangladesh, lead chromate has been added to turmeric to make it more yellow. This is believed to have started in the 1980s. It was believed to have been one of the main sources of high lead levels in the country. Following a 2019 report identifying adulterated turmeric as the main cause of lead poisoning in Bangladesh, the government began a rapid crackdown and public service campaign on it. By 2021, leaded turmeric had vanished from the Bangladeshi market, and blood lead levels in workers at turmeric mills had dropped by a median of 30%.

In Hong Kong, the maximum allowed lead parts per million is 6 in solid foods and 1 in liquid foods.

In December 2022, 28 dark chocolate brands were tested by Consumer Reports, which found that 23 of them contained cadmium, lead or both. When cocoa beans are set outside near polluting industrial plants, they can be contaminated by dust containing lead.

The Centers for Disease Control publishes conversion factors that relate blood lead levels to dietary lead, yielding interim reference levels (IRLs) for daily consumption of lead in food. As of 2021, CDC's blood lead reference value (BLRV) is 3.5 μg/dL. For all children, the conversion factor is 0.16 μg/dL per μg Pb per day yielding an IRL of 2.2 μg/day. For females of childbearing age, the numbers are 0.04 and 8.8, respectively. No other groups are defined. By comparison, California's No Significant Risk Levels (NSRLs) for carcinogens and Maximum Allowable Dose Levels (MADLs) are 15 and 0.5 μg/day, respectively.

=== Paint ===
Some lead compounds are colorful and are used widely in paints, and lead paint is a major route of lead exposure in children. A study conducted in 1998–2000 found that 38 million housing units in the US had lead-based paint, down from a 1990 estimate of 64 million. Deteriorating lead paint can produce dangerous lead levels in household dust and soil. Deteriorating lead paint and lead-containing household dust are the main causes of chronic lead poisoning. The lead breaks down into the dust, and since children are more prone to crawling on the floor, it is easily ingested. Many young children display pica, eating things that are not food. Even a small amount of a lead-containing product, such as a paint chip or a sip of glaze, can contain tens or hundreds of milligrams of lead. Eating chips of lead paint presents a particular hazard to children, generally producing more severe poisoning than lead-contaminated dust. Because removing lead paint from dwellings, e.g. by sanding or torching, creates lead-containing dust and fumes, it is generally safer to seal the lead paint under new paint (excepting moveable windows and doors, which create paint dust when operated). Alternatively, special precautions must be taken if the lead paint is to be removed.

In oil painting, it was once common for colours such as yellow or white to be made with lead carbonate. Lead white oil colour was the main white of oil painters until superseded by compounds containing zinc or titanium in the mid-20th century. It is speculated that the painter Caravaggio and possibly Francisco Goya and Vincent Van Gogh had lead poisoning due to overexposure or carelessness when handling this colour.

=== Soil ===
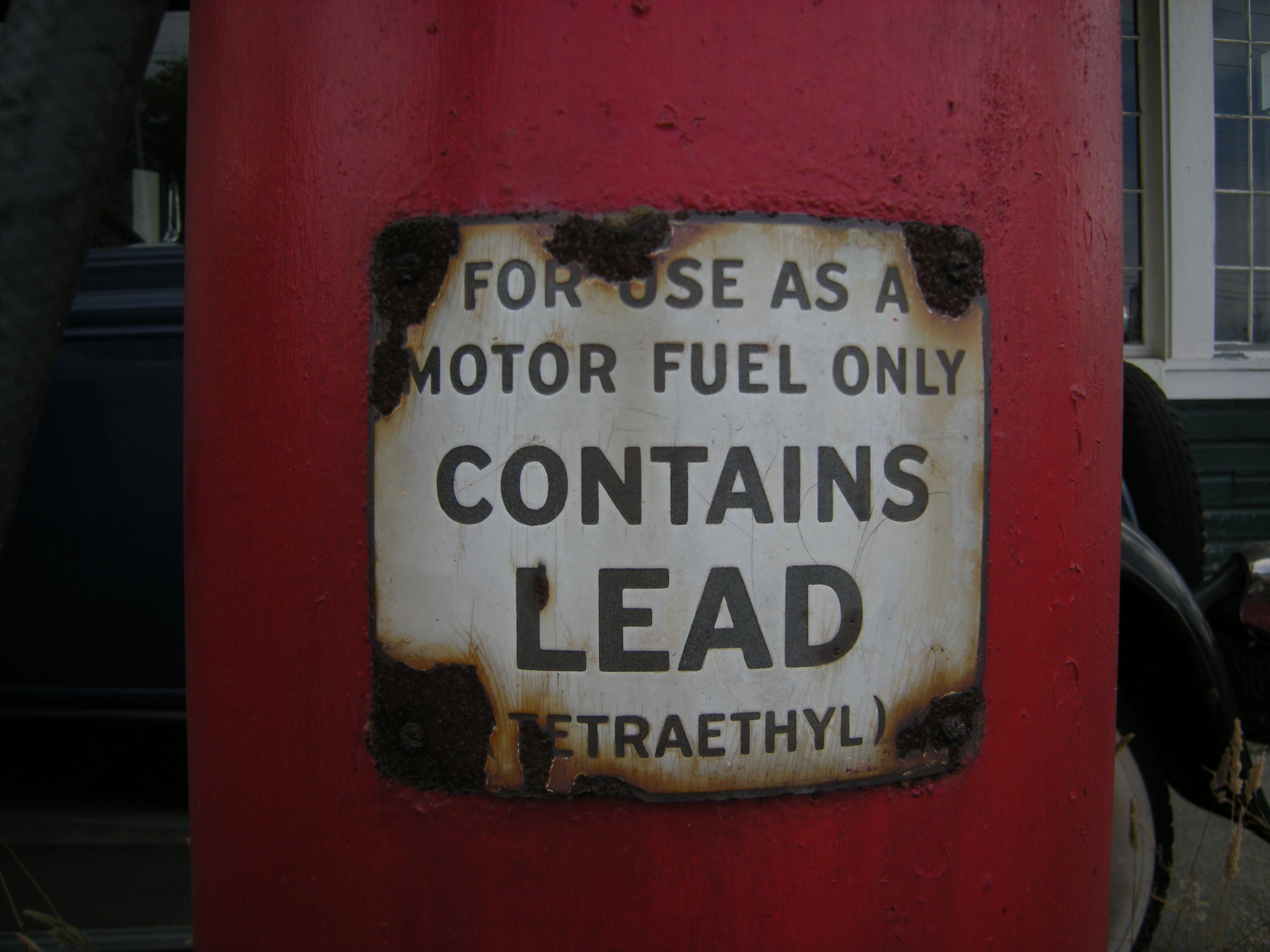
A lead warning on a fuel pump. Tetraethyllead, which used to be added to automotive gasoline (and still is added to some aviation gasolines), contributed to soil contamination.

Residual lead in soil contributes to lead exposure in urban areas. It has been thought that the more polluted an area is with various contaminants, the more likely it is to contain lead. However, this is not always the case, as there are several other reasons for lead contamination in soil.

Lead content in soil may be caused by broken-down lead paint, residues from lead-containing gasoline, used engine oil, tire weights, or pesticides used in the past, contaminated landfills, or from nearby industries such as foundries or smelters. For example, in the Montevideo neighborhood of La Teja, former industrial sites became important sources of exposure in local communities in the early 2000s. Although leaded soil is less of a problem in countries that no longer have leaded gasoline, it remains prevalent, raising concerns about the safety of urban agriculture; eating food grown in contaminated soil can present a lead hazard. Interfacial solar evaporation has been recently studied as a technique for remediating lead-contaminated sites, which involves the evaporation of heavy metal ions from moist soil.

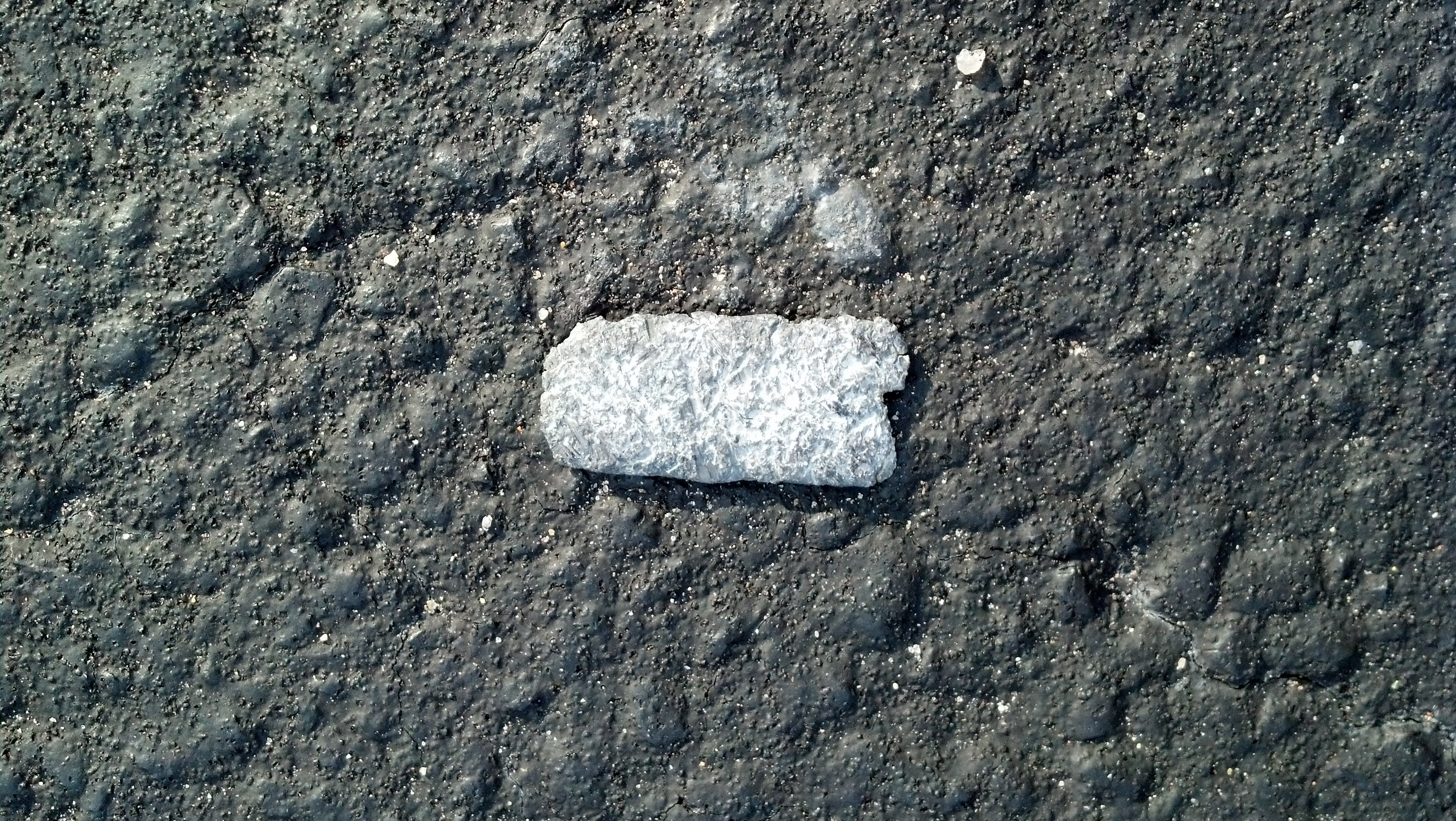
Lead wheel weight eroding on road.

=== Water ===
Lead from the atmosphere or soil can end up in groundwater and surface water. It is also potentially found in drinking water carried by pipes that are either made with lead or have lead solder. Chloramines, which were adopted as a substitute for chlorine disinfectants due to fewer health concerns, increase corrosivity which may leach lead from pipes into drinking water. In the US, 14–20% of total lead exposure is attributed to drinking water.

Collected rainwater from roof runoff used as potable water may contain lead if there are lead contaminants on the roof or in the storage tank. The Australian Drinking Water Guidelines allow a maximum of 0.01 mg/L (10 ppb) lead in water.

Leaded wheel weights have been found to accumulate on roads and interstates when they become dislodged from passing cars. The wheel weights then erode in traffic and in the environment, entering the water runoff through drains. Water runoff near roads in urban areas and parking lots have been found to have high levels of lead due to contamination from wheel weights.

Leaded fishing weights may be discarded in rivers, streams, lakes, ponds, and other waterways and are then ingested by wildlife which become poisoned. Leaded fishing weights have been found to poison and kill many forms of wildlife, including birds, fish, reptiles, and mammals. Fisherman and others who handle leaded fishing weights have also been found to have lead residue on their hands, leading to exposure. Coating fishing weights with paint does not have a protective effect, as the paint quickly degrades and erodes from the equipment.

=== Gasoline ===
Tetraethyllead was first added to gasoline in 1923, as it helped prevent engine knocking. Automotive exhaust represented a major way for lead to be inhaled, invade the bloodstream, and pass into the brain.

The use of lead in gasoline peaked in the 1970s. By the next decade, most high-income countries prohibited the use of leaded petrol. As late as 2002, almost all low- and middle-income countries, including some OECD members, still used it. The UN Environment Programme (UNEP) thus launched a campaign in 2002 to eliminate its use, leading to Algeria being the last country to stop its use in July 2021.

=== Lead-containing products ===
Lead can be found in products such as kohl, an ancient cosmetic from the Middle East, South Asia, and parts of Africa that has many other names, and in some toys. In 2007, millions of toys made in China were recalled from multiple countries owing to safety hazards, including lead paint. Vinyl mini-blinds, found especially in older housing, may contain lead. Lead is commonly incorporated into herbal remedies such as Indian Ayurvedic preparations and remedies of Chinese origin. There are also risks of elevated blood lead levels caused by folk remedies like azarcon and greta, powders containing lead tetroxide and lead oxide, respectively, which each contain about 95% lead.

Ingestion of metallic lead, such as small lead fishing lures, increases blood lead levels and can be fatal. Ingestion of lead-contaminated food is also a threat. Ceramic glaze often contains lead, and dishes that have been improperly fired can leach the metal into food, potentially causing severe poisoning. In some places, the solder in cans used for food contains lead. People who eat animals hunted with lead bullets may be at risk for lead exposure. Bullets lodged in the human body rarely cause significant levels of lead, but bullets lodged in the joints are the exception, as they deteriorate and release lead into the body over time.

In May 2015, Indian food safety regulators in the state of Uttar Pradesh found that samples of Maggi 2 Minute Noodles contained lead up to 17 times beyond permissible limits. On 3 June 2015, the New Delhi Government banned the sale of Maggi noodles in New Delhi stores for 15 days because it was found to contain lead beyond the permissible limit. The Gujarat FDA on 4 June 2015 banned the noodles for 30 days after 27 out of 39 samples were detected with objectionable levels of metallic lead, among other things. Some of India's biggest retailers like Future Group, Big Bazaar, Easyday, and Nilgiris have imposed a nationwide ban on Maggi noodles. Many other states too have banned Maggi noodles.

=== Bullets ===
Contact with ammunition is a source of lead exposure. As of 2013, lead-based ammunition production is the second largest annual use of lead in the US, accounting for over 84,800 metric tons in 2013, second only to the manufacture of storage batteries. The Environmental Protection Agency (EPA) cannot regulate cartridges and shells, as a matter of law. Lead birdshot is banned in some areas, but this is primarily for the benefit of the birds and their predators, rather than humans. Contamination from heavily used gun ranges is of concern to those who live near by. Non-lead alternatives include copper, zinc, steel, tungsten-nickel-iron, bismuth-tin, and polymer blends such as tungsten-polymer and copper-polymer.

Because game animals can be shot using lead bullets, the potential for lead ingestion from game meat consumption has been studied clinically and epidemiologically. In a study conducted by the CDC in 2009, a cohort from North Dakota was enrolled and asked to self-report historical consumption of game meat, and participation in other activities that could cause lead exposure. The study found that participants' age, sex, housing age, current hobbies with potential for lead exposure, and game consumption were all associated with blood lead level (PbB).

According to a study published in 2008, 1.1% of the 736 persons consuming wild game meat tested had PbB ≥5 μg/dL In November 2015 the US Health and Human Services (HHS), Centers for Disease Control and Prevention (CDC), and National Institute for Occupational Safety and Health (NIOSH) designated 5 μg/dL (five micrograms per deciliter) of whole blood, in a venous blood sample, as the reference blood lead level for adults. An elevated blood lead level (BLL) is defined as a BLL ≥5 μg/dL. This case definition is used by the Adult Blood Lead Epidemiology and Surveillance (ABLES) program, the Council of State and Territorial Epidemiologists (CSTE), and the CDC's National Notifiable Diseases Surveillance System (NNDSS). Previously (i.e., from 2009 until November 2015), the case definition for an elevated BLL was a BLL ≥10 μg/dL.

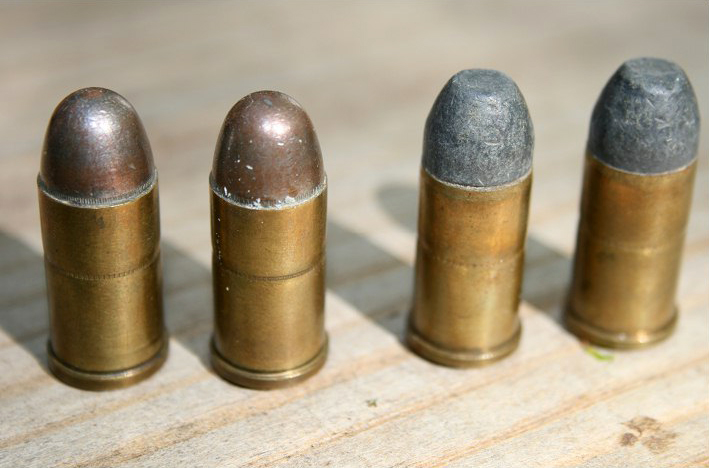
Jacketed ammunition (left), bare lead (right).

To virtually eliminate the potential for lead contamination, some researchers have suggested the use of lead-free copper non-fragmenting bullets.

Bismuth is an element used as a lead replacement for shotgun pellets used in waterfowl hunting, although shotshells made from bismuth are nearly ten times the cost of lead.

=== Opium ===
Lead-contaminated opium has been the source of poisoning in Iran and other Middle Eastern countries. This has also appeared in the illicit narcotic supply in North America, resulting in confirmed lead poisoning.

=== Cannabis ===
In 2007, a mass poisoning due to adulterated marijuana was uncovered in Leipzig, Germany, where 29 young adults were hospitalized with lead poisoning for several months after having smoked marijuana that had been tainted with small lead particles. One hypothesis from the police was that lead, with its high specific gravity, was used to increase the weight of street marijuana sold by the gram, thereby maximizing the dealers' profits. The researchers estimated that the profit per kilogram increased by as much as $1,500 with the lead added. It is common for drugs to be cut with less-expensive substances to increase the profits of dealers or distributors (e.g., cocaine is routinely adulterated with sugars, talcum powder, magnesium salts, and even other drugs). It is thought that the adverse reactions to many of these drugs are a result of poor manufacturing rather than face-value overdoses.

Besides adulteration, cannabis plants have an inherent ability to absorb heavy metals from the soil. This makes them useful for remediating contaminated sites. But this may also make cannabis dangerous for consumers who ingest it. Some cannabis strains have been bred specifically to remove pollutants from soil, air, or water, a method known as phytoremediation.

In 2022, around 40% of cannabis products sold at unlicensed storefronts in New York City were found to contain heavy metals (e.g., lead, nickel), pesticides, and bacteria.

== Toxicokinetics ==
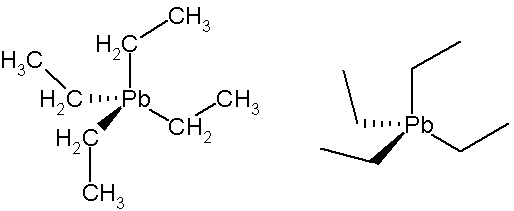
Tetraethyllead, still used as an additive in some fuels, can be absorbed through the skin.

Toxicokinetics describes how the body handles the toxin over time, including absorption, distribution, metabolism, and excretion.

Exposure occurs through inhalation, ingestion, or occasionally skin contact. Lead may be taken in through direct contact with the mouth, nostrils, and eyes (mucous membranes), and breaks in the skin. Tetraethyllead, which was a gasoline additive and is still used in aviation gasoline, passes through the skin; and other forms of lead, including inorganic lead are also absorbed through skin. The main sources of absorption of inorganic lead are from ingestion and inhalation. In adults, about 35–40% of inhaled lead dust is deposited in the lungs, and about 95% of that goes into the bloodstream. Of ingested inorganic lead, about 15% is absorbed, but this percentage is higher in children, pregnant women, and people with deficiencies of calcium, zinc, or iron. Infants may absorb about 50% of ingested lead, but little is known about absorption rates in children.

The main body tissues that store lead are the blood, soft tissues, and bone; the half-life of lead in these tissues is measured in weeks for blood, months for soft tissues, and years for bone. Lead in the bones, teeth, hair, and nails is bound tightly and not available to other tissues, and is generally thought not to be harmful. In adults, 94% of absorbed lead is deposited in the bones and teeth, but children only store 70% in this manner, a fact which may partially account for the more serious health effects on children. The half-life of lead in bone has been estimated as years to decades, and bone can introduce lead into the bloodstream long after the initial exposure is gone. The half-life of lead in the blood in men is about 40 days, but it may be longer in children and pregnant women, whose bones are undergoing remodeling, which allows the lead to be continuously re-introduced into the bloodstream. Also, if lead exposure takes place over the years, clearance is much slower, partly due to the re-release of lead from bone. Many other tissues store lead, but those with the highest concentrations (other than blood, bone, and teeth) are the brain, spleen, kidneys, liver, and lungs. Lead is removed from the body very slowly, mainly through urine. Smaller amounts of lead are also eliminated through the feces, and very small amounts in hair, nails, and sweat.

== Toxicodynamics ==
Toxicodynamics describes how the toxin affects the body, including the mechanisms causing its symptoms. Lead has no known physiologically necessary role in the body, and its harmful effects are myriad. Lead and other heavy metals create reactive radicals which damage cell structures, including DNA and cell membranes. Lead also interferes with DNA transcription, enzymes that help in the synthesis of vitamin D, and enzymes that maintain the integrity of the cell membrane. Anemia may result when the cell membranes of red blood cells become more fragile as a result of damage to their membranes. Lead interferes with metabolism of bones and teeth and alters the permeability of blood vessels and collagen synthesis. Lead may also be harmful to the developing immune system, causing production of excessive inflammatory proteins; this mechanism may mean that lead exposure is a risk factor for asthma in children. Lead exposure has also been associated with a decrease in activity of immune cells such as polymorphonuclear leukocytes. Lead also interferes with the normal metabolism of calcium in cells and causes it to build up within them.

=== Enzymes ===
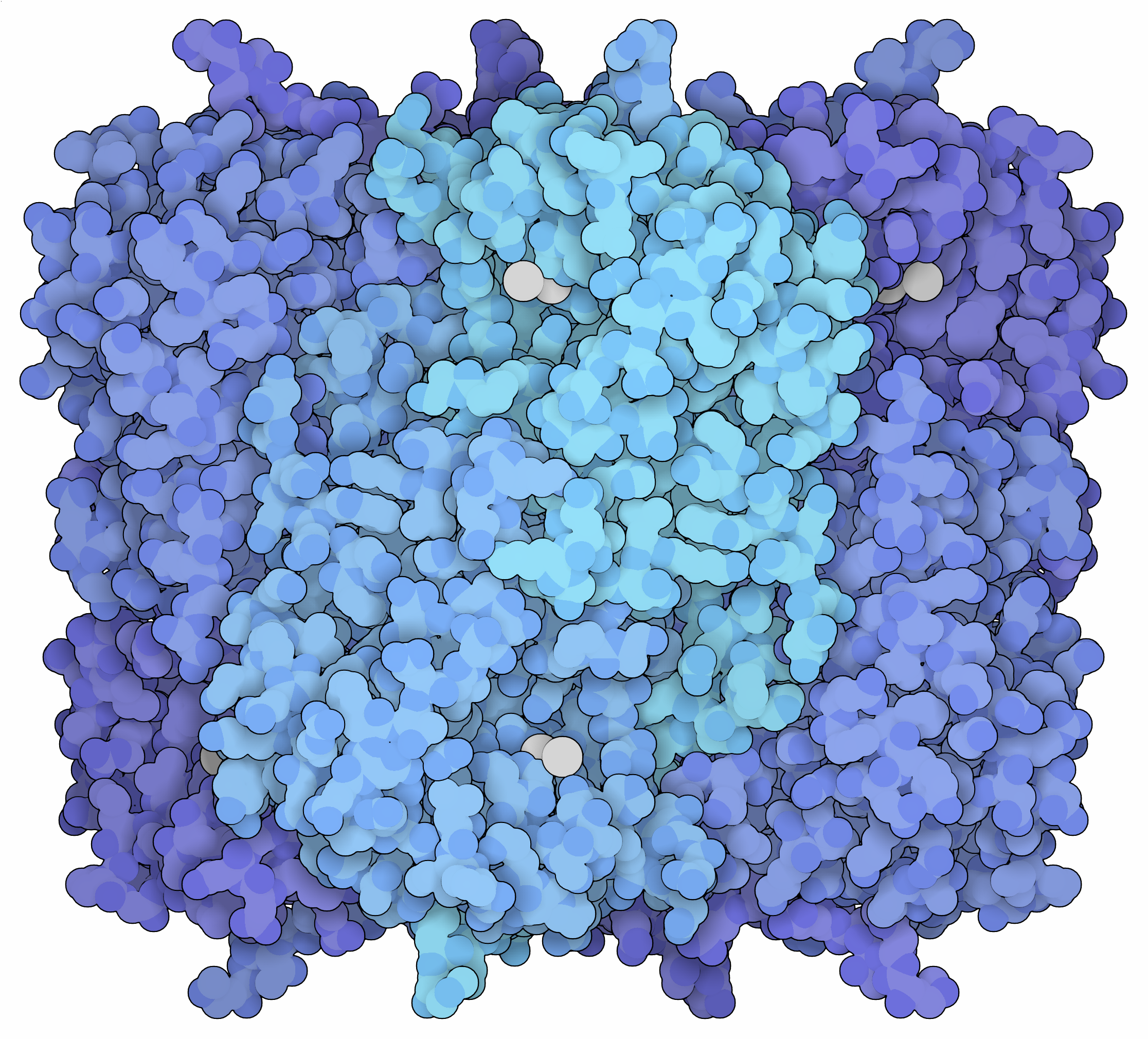
ALAD enzyme with lead bound (PDB: 1QNV).

The primary cause of lead's toxicity is its interference with a variety of enzymes because it binds to sulfhydryl groups found on many enzymes. Part of lead's toxicity results from its ability to mimic other metals that take part in biological processes, which act as cofactors in many enzymatic reactions, displacing them at the enzymes on which they act. Lead can bind to and interact with many of the same enzymes as these metals but, due to its differing chemistry, does not properly function as a cofactor, thus interfering with the enzyme's ability to catalyze its normal reaction or reactions. Among the essential metals that lead displaces in this way are calcium, iron, and zinc.

The lead ion has a lone pair in its electronic structure, which can result in a distortion in the coordination of ligands, and in 2007 was hypothesized to be important in lead poisoning's effects on enzymes (see Lone pair § Unusual lone pairs).

One of the main causes for the pathology of lead is that it interferes with the activity of an essential enzyme called delta-aminolevulinic acid dehydratase, or ALAD (see image of the enzyme structure), which is important in the biosynthesis of heme, the cofactor found in hemoglobin. Lead also inhibits the enzyme ferrochelatase, another enzyme involved in the formation of heme. Ferrochelatase catalyzes the joining of protoporphyrin and Fe^{2+} to form heme. Lead's interference with heme synthesis results in production of zinc protoporphyrin and the development of anemia. Another effect of lead's interference with heme synthesis is the buildup of heme precursors, such as aminolevulinic acid, which may be directly or indirectly harmful to neurons. Elevation of aminolevulinic acid results in lead poisoning, having symptoms similar to acute porphyria.

=== Neurons ===
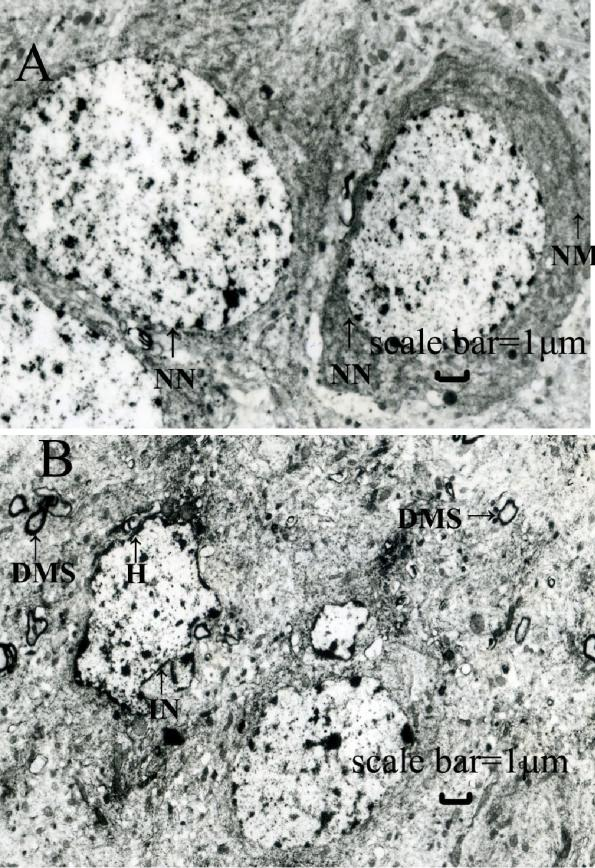
Lead exposure damages cells in the hippocampus, a part of the brain involved in memory. Hippocampi of lead-exposed rats (bottom) show structural damage such as irregular nuclei (IN) and denaturation of myelin (DMS) compared to controls (top).

The brain is the organ most sensitive to lead exposure. Lead can pass through the endothelial cells at the blood brain barrier because it can substitute for calcium ions and be taken up by calcium-ATPase pumps. Lead poisoning interferes with the normal development of a child's brain and nervous system; therefore children are at greater risk of lead neurotoxicity than adults are. In a child's developing brain, lead interferes with synapse formation in the cerebral cortex, neurochemical development (including that of neurotransmitters), and organization of ion channels. It causes loss of neurons' myelin sheaths, reduces the numbers of neurons, interferes with neurotransmission, and decreases neuronal growth.

Lead ions (Pb^{2+}), like magnesium ions (Mg^{2+}), block NMDA receptors. Therefore, an increase in Pb^{2+} concentration will effectively inhibit ongoing long-term potentiation (LTP), and lead to an abnormal increase in long-term depression (LTD) on neurons in the affected parts of the nervous system. These abnormalities lead to the indirect downregulation of NMDA-receptors, effectively initiating a positive feedback-loop for LTD. The targeting of NMDA receptors is thought to be one of the main causes for lead's toxicity to neurons.

== Diagnosis ==
Diagnosis includes determining the clinical signs and the medical history, with inquiry into possible routes of exposure. Clinical toxicologists, medical specialists in the area of poisoning, may be involved in diagnosis and treatment. The main test in diagnosing and assessing the severity of lead poisoning is laboratory analysis of the blood lead level (BLL).

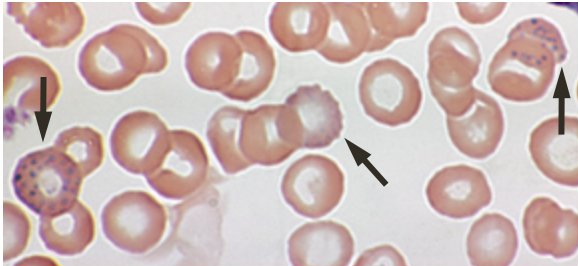
Basophilic stippling (arrows) of red blood cells in a 53-year-old who had elevated blood lead levels due to drinking repeatedly from glasses decorated with lead paint.

Blood film examination may reveal basophilic stippling of red blood cells (dots in red blood cells visible through a microscope), as well as the changes normally associated with iron-deficiency anemia (microcytosis and hypochromasia). This may be known as sideroblastic anemia. However, basophilic stippling is also seen in unrelated conditions, such as megaloblastic anemia caused by vitamin B12 (cobalamin) and folate deficiencies. Contrary to other sideroblastic anemias, there are no ring sideroblasts in a bone marrow smear.

Exposure to lead can also be evaluated by measuring erythrocyte protoporphyrin (EP) in blood samples. EP is a part of red blood cells known to increase when the amount of lead in the blood is high, with a delay of a few weeks. Thus EP levels in conjunction with blood lead levels can suggest the period of exposure; if blood lead levels are high but EP is still normal, this finding suggests exposure was recent. However, the EP level alone is not sensitive enough to identify elevated blood lead levels below about 35 μg/dL. Due to this higher threshold for detection and the fact that EP levels also increase in iron deficiency, use of this method for detecting lead exposure has decreased.

Chelation challenge (also known as provocation testing) is a diagnostic test used to mobilize the body's heavy metal stores (including lead). This testing involves collecting urine before and after administering a one-off dose of chelating agent to mobilize heavy metals into the urine. Then urine is analyzed by a laboratory for levels of heavy metals and overall body burden is inferred. Chelation challenge mainly measures the burden of lead in soft tissues, though whether it accurately reflects long-term exposure or the amount of lead stored in bone remains controversial. Although the technique has been used to determine whether chelation therapy is indicated and to diagnose heavy metal poisoning, some evidence does not support these uses as blood levels after chelation are not comparable to the reference range typically used to diagnose heavy metal poisoning. The single chelation dose could also redistribute the heavy metals to more sensitive areas such as the brain, causing harm. Chelation challenges are a poor indicator of heavy metal poisoning. The American College of Medical Toxicology (ACMT) recommends against using a chelation challenge for the diagnosis of heavy metal toxicities (including lead toxicity). The ACMT stated that chelation challenges are not accurate, have no demonstrated benefits, may lead to treatment that is not needed, and may be harmful to those subjected to the test.

Lead in bones can be measured noninvasively by X-ray fluorescence; this may be the best measure of cumulative exposure and total body burden. However, this method is not widely available and is mainly used for research rather than routine diagnosis. Another radiographic sign of elevated lead levels is the presence of radiodense lines called lead lines at the metaphysis in the long bones of growing children, especially around the knees. These lead lines, caused by increased calcification due to disrupted metabolism in the growing bones, become wider as the duration of lead exposure increases. X-rays may also reveal lead-containing foreign materials such as paint chips in the gastrointestinal tract.

Lead poisoning shares symptoms with other conditions and may be easily missed. Conditions that present similarly and must be ruled out in diagnosing lead poisoning include carpal tunnel syndrome, Guillain–Barré syndrome, renal colic, appendicitis, encephalitis in adults, and viral gastroenteritis in children. Other differential diagnoses in children include constipation, abdominal colic, iron deficiency, subdural hematoma, neoplasms of the central nervous system, emotional and behavior disorders, and intellectual disability.

=== Reference levels ===
The current reference range for acceptable blood lead concentrations in healthy persons without excessive exposure to environmental sources of lead is less than 3.5 μg/dL for children. It was less than 25 μg/dL for adults. Previous to 2012, the value for children was 10 (μg/dL). Lead-exposed workers in the US are required to be removed from work when their level is greater than 50 μg/dL if they do construction and otherwise greater than 60 μg/dL.

In 2015, the US Health and Human Services (HHS), Centers for Disease Control and Prevention (CDC), and National Institute for Occupational Safety and Health (NIOSH) designated 5 μg/dL (five micrograms per deciliter) of whole blood, in a venous blood sample, as the reference blood lead level for adults. An elevated blood lead level (BLL) is defined as a BLL ≥5 μg/dL. This case definition is used by the Adult Blood Lead Epidemiology and Surveillance (ABLES) program, the Council of State and Territorial Epidemiologists (CSTE), and the CDC's National Notifiable Diseases Surveillance System (NNDSS). Previously (i.e., from 2009 until November 2015), the case definition for an elevated BLL was a BLL ≥10 μg/dL. The US national BLL geometric mean among adults was 1.2 μg/dL in 2009–2010.

Blood lead concentrations in poisoning victims have ranged from 30 to 80 μg/dL in children exposed to lead paint in older houses, 77–104 μg/dL in persons working with pottery glazes, 90–137 μg/dL in individuals consuming contaminated herbal medicines, 109–139 μg/dL in indoor shooting range instructors and as high as 330 μg/dL in those drinking fruit juices from glazed earthenware containers.

== Prevention ==
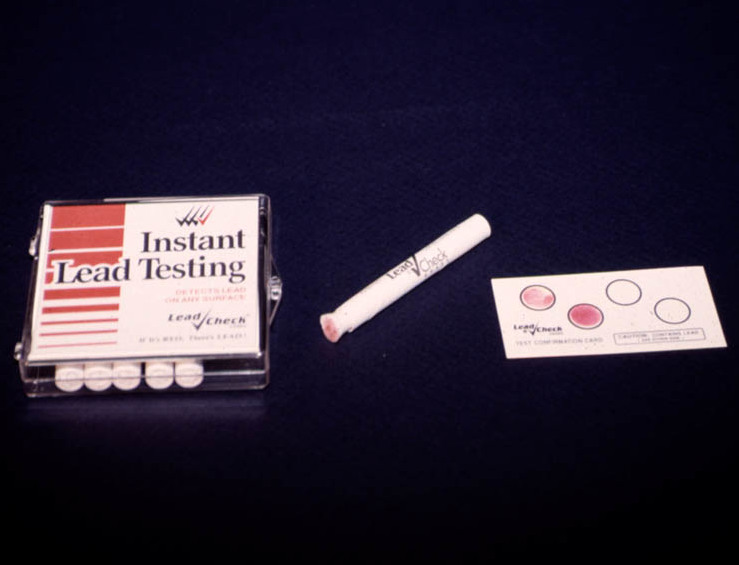
Testing kits are commercially available for detecting lead. These swabs, when wiped on a surface, turn red in the presence of lead.

Prevention for lead poisoning can be divided into primary, secondary, and tertiary prevention methods.

=== Primary prevention ===
Primary prevention of lead poisoning aims to address the root cause of the problem before any adverse health outcomes occur. This can be achieved through an attempt to remove the sources of lead poisoning (either by government, corporations, or individuals) or by educating individuals and communities about lead exposure, its sources, and its health impacts which can help prevent lead poisoning from happening in the first place.

Lead pipe replacement

Lead pipe replacement is one of the most effective ways to reduce lead in water, as lead service lines are the leading drinking water contamination source. Replacement of lead service lines has been shown to drastically reduce lead levels in water. When considering lead line replacement as a primary prevention method, it is essential to specify the need for complete replacement versus partial replacement as partial replacement of lead service lines can disturb/dislodge lead in unreplaced portions of the pipe, leading to increased concentrations of lead in water.

Education

The education of workers on lead, its danger, and how its workplace exposure can be decreased, especially when initial blood lead level and urine lead level are high, could help reduce the risk of lead poisoning in the workplace.

Additional primary prevention

Recommended steps by individuals to reduce the blood lead levels of children include increasing their frequency of hand washing and their intake of calcium and iron, discouraging them from putting their hands to their mouths, vacuuming frequently, and eliminating the presence of lead-containing objects such as blinds and jewellery in the house. In houses with lead pipes or plumbing solder, these can be replaced. Less permanent but cheaper methods include running water in the morning to flush out the most contaminated water, or adjusting the water's chemistry to prevent corrosion of pipes. Lead testing kits are commercially available for detecting the presence of lead in the household. Testing kit accuracy depends on the user testing all layers of paint and the quality of the kit; the US Environmental Protection Agency (EPA) only approves kits with an accuracy rating of at least 95%. Professional lead testing companies caution that DIY test kits can create health risks for users who do not understand their limitations and liability issues for employers concerning worker protection. As hot water is more likely than cold water to contain higher amounts of lead, only cold water from the tap should be used for drinking, cooking, and making baby formula. Since most of the lead in household water usually comes from plumbing in the house and not from the local water supply, using cold water can avoid lead exposure. Measures such as dust control and household education do not appear to be effective in changing children's blood levels.

Prevention measures also exist on the national and municipal levels. Recommendations by health professionals for lowering childhood exposures include banning the use of lead where it is not essential and strengthening regulations that limit the amount of lead in soil, water, air, household dust, and products. Regulations exist to limit the amount of lead in paint; for example, a 1978 law in the US restricted the lead in paint for residences, furniture, and toys to 0.06% or less. In October 2008, the US EPA reduced the allowable lead level by a factor of ten to 0.15 micrograms per cubic meter of air, giving states five years to comply with the standards. The European Union's Restriction of Hazardous Substances Directive limits amounts of lead and other toxic substances in electronics and electrical equipment. In some places, remediation programs exist to reduce the presence of lead when it is found to be high, for example, in drinking water. As a more radical solution, entire towns located near former lead mines have been bought out by the government, with the population resettled elsewhere, as was the case with Picher, Oklahoma in 2009.

Removing lead from airplane fuel would prevent approximately 450 tons of lead from being released into the environment every year.

=== Secondary prevention ===
Secondary prevention of lead poisoning seeks to detect early exposures in individuals and intervene to prevent progression and long-term health complications.

Screening

Screening may be an important method of prevention for those at high risk, such as those who live near lead-related industries. The United States Preventive Services Task Force (USPSTF) has stated that general screening of those without symptoms, including children and pregnant women, is of unclear benefit as of 2019. The American College of Obstetricians and Gynecologists (ACOG) and American Academy of Pediatrics (AAP), however, recommend asking about risk factors and testing those who have them.

=== Tertiary prevention ===
Tertiary prevention methods focus on treatment, mitigation of symptoms, and improving quality of life in individuals who have already been affected by lead poisoning. These treatment methods are explored in the following section.

== Treatment ==
CDC management guidelines for children with elevated blood levels
Blood lead level (μg/dL)	Treatment
10–14	Education, repeat screening
15–19	Repeat screening, case management to abate sources
20–44	Medical evaluation, case management
45–69	Medical evaluation, chelation, case management
>69	Hospitalization, immediate chelation, case management

The mainstays of treatment are removal from the source of lead and, for people who have significantly high blood lead levels or who have symptoms of poisoning, chelation therapy. Treatment of iron, calcium, and zinc deficiencies, which are associated with increased lead absorption, is another part of treatment for lead poisoning. When lead-containing materials are present in the gastrointestinal tract (as evidenced by abdominal X-rays), whole bowel irrigation, cathartics, endoscopy, or even surgical removal may be used to eliminate it from the gut and prevent further exposure. Lead-containing bullets and shrapnel may also present a threat of further exposure and may need to be surgically removed if they are in or near fluid-filled or synovial spaces. If lead encephalopathy is present, anticonvulsants may be given to control seizures, and treatments to control swelling of the brain include corticosteroids and mannitol. Treatment of organic lead poisoning involves removing the lead compound from the skin, preventing further exposure, treating seizures, and possibly chelation therapy for people with high blood lead concentrations.

Before the advent of organic chelating agents, salts of iodide were given orally, such as heavily popularized by Louis Melsens and many nineteenth- and early twentieth-century doctors.

EDTA, a chelating agent, binds a heavy metal, sequestering it.

A chelating agent is a molecule with at least two negatively charged groups that allow it to form complexes with metal ions with multiple positive charges, such as lead. The chelate that is thus formed is nontoxic and can be excreted in the urine, initially at up to 50 times the normal rate. The chelating agents used for treatment of lead poisoning are edetate disodium calcium (CaNa_{2}EDTA), dimercaprol (BAL), which are injected, and succimer and d-penicillamine, which are administered orally. Chelation therapy is used in cases of acute lead poisoning, severe poisoning, and encephalopathy, and is considered for people with blood lead levels above 25 μg/dL. While the use of chelation for people with symptoms of lead poisoning is widely supported, use in asymptomatic people with high blood lead levels is more controversial. Chelation therapy is of limited value for cases of chronic exposure to low levels of lead. Chelation therapy is usually stopped when symptoms resolve or when blood lead levels return to premorbid levels. When lead exposure has taken place over a long period, blood lead levels may rise after chelation is stopped because lead is leached into blood from stores in the bone; thus, repeated treatments are often necessary.

People receiving dimercaprol need to be assessed for peanut allergies since the commercial formulation contains peanut oil. Calcium EDTA is also effective if administered four hours after the administration of dimercaprol. Administering dimercaprol, DMSA (Succimer), or DMPS before calcium EDTA is necessary to prevent the redistribution of lead into the central nervous system. Dimercaprol used alone may also redistribute lead to the brain and testes. An adverse side effect of calcium EDTA is renal toxicity. Succimer (DMSA) is the preferred agent in mild to moderate lead poisoning cases. This may be the case in instances where children have a blood lead level >25 μg/dL. The most reported adverse side effect for succimer is gastrointestinal disturbances. It is also important to note that chelation therapy only lowers blood lead levels and may not prevent the lead-induced cognitive problems associated with lower lead levels in tissue. This may be because of the inability of these agents to remove sufficient amounts of lead from tissue or the inability to reverse preexisting damage. Chelating agents can have adverse effects; for example, chelation therapy can lower the body's levels of necessary nutrients like zinc. Chelating agents taken orally can increase the body's absorption of lead through the intestine.

== Epidemiology ==
Death rate lead exposure

Since lead has been used widely for centuries, the effects of exposure are worldwide. Environmental lead is ubiquitous, and everyone has some measurable blood lead level. Atmospheric lead pollution increased dramatically beginning in the 1950s as a result of the widespread use of leaded gasoline. Lead is one of the largest environmental medicine problems in terms of numbers of people exposed and the public health toll it takes. Lead exposure accounts for about 0.2% of all deaths and 0.6% of disability adjusted life years globally. Despite this, it is estimated that efforts to prevent lead exposure receive only approximately $0.31 of funding per year of healthy life impacted - some six hundred times less than the equivalent funding for HIV.

Although regulation reducing lead in products has greatly reduced exposure in the developed world since the 1970s, lead is still allowed in products in many developing countries. According to the World Health Organization, as of June 2022, only 45% of countries had confirmed legally-binding controls on production and use of lead paint. Significant disparities exist in the enactment of bans, with regions such as the Middle East, North Africa, and Sub-Saharan Africa currently the most likely to have countries lacking such measures. Despite a phase-out in many parts of the Global North, Global South exposure has increased by nearly three times. In all countries that have banned leaded gasoline, average blood lead levels have fallen sharply. However, some developing countries still allow leaded gasoline, which is the primary source of lead exposure in most developing countries. Beyond exposure from gasoline, the frequent use of pesticides in developing countries adds a risk of lead exposure and subsequent poisoning. Poor children in developing countries are at especially high risk for lead poisoning. Of North American children, 7% have blood lead levels above 10 μg/dL, whereas among Central and South American children, the percentage is 33–34%. About one fifth of the world's disease burden from lead poisoning occurs in the Western Pacific, and another fifth is in Southeast Asia.

In developed countries, people with low levels of education living in poorer areas are most at risk for elevated lead. In the US, the groups most at risk for lead exposure are the impoverished, city-dwellers, and immigrants. African-American children and those living in old housing have also been found to be at elevated risk for high blood lead levels in the US. Low-income people often live in old housing with lead paint, which may begin to peel, exposing residents to high levels of lead-containing dust.

Risk factors for elevated lead exposure include alcohol consumption and smoking (possibly because of contamination of tobacco leaves with lead-containing pesticides). Adults with certain risk factors might be more susceptible to toxicity; these include calcium and iron deficiencies, old age, disease of organs targeted by lead (e.g., the brain, the kidneys), and possibly genetic susceptibility. Differences in vulnerability to lead-induced neurological damage between males and females have also been found, but some studies have found males to be at greater risk, while others have found females to be.

In adults, blood lead levels steadily increase with increasing age. In adults of all ages, men have higher blood lead levels than women do. Children are more sensitive to elevated blood lead levels than adults are. Children may also have a higher intake of lead than adults; they breathe faster and may be more likely to have contact with and ingest soil. Children aged one to three tend to have the highest blood lead levels, possibly because at that age they begin to walk and explore their environment, and they use their mouths in their exploration. Blood levels usually peak at about 18–24 months old. In many countries, including the US, household paint and dust are the major route of exposure in children.

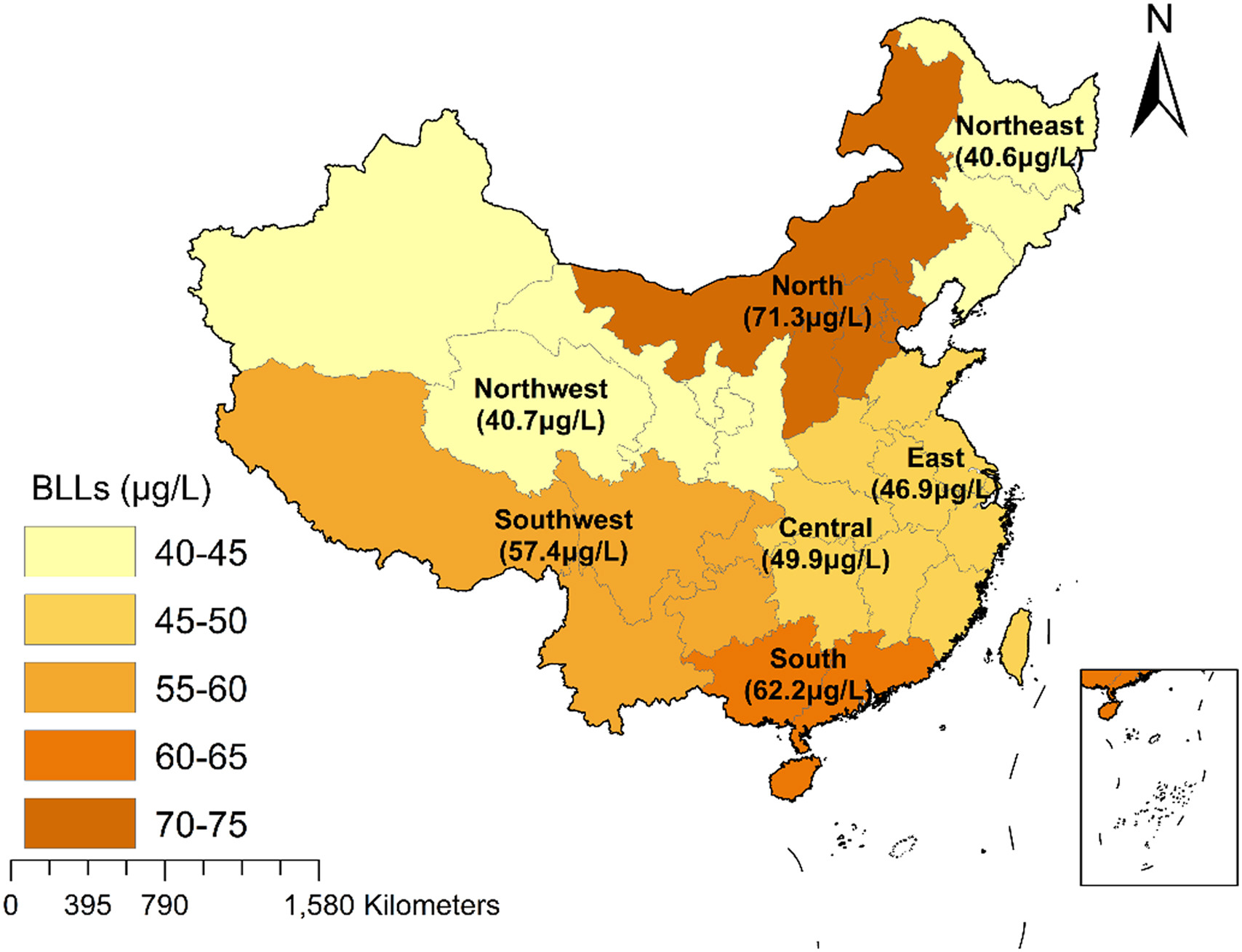
Map showing the mean blood lead levels (BLLs) of adults in China during 1980–2018.

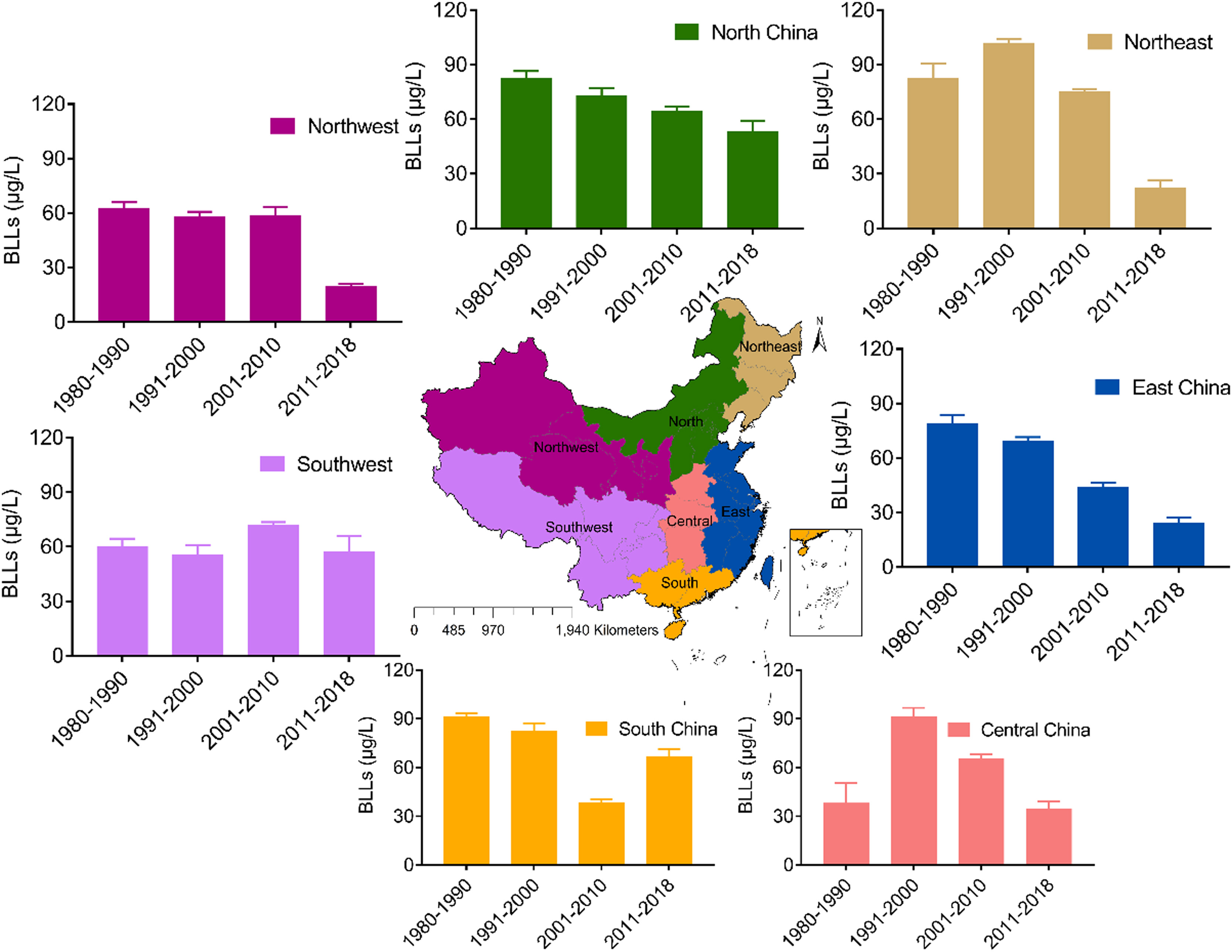
Trend of blood lead levels (BLLs) in Chinese adults in different regions from 1980 to 2018. A decreasing trend was found in all regions except for South China.

=== Notable cases ===
Cases of mass lead poisoning can occur. In 2009, 15,000 people were planned to be relocated from Jiyuan in central Henan province to other locations after 1000 children living around China's largest smelter plant (owned and operated by Yuguang Gold and Lead) were found to have excess lead in their blood. The total cost of this project is estimated to around 1 billion yuan ($150 million). Seventy percent of the cost was estimated to be paid by the local government and the smelter company, while the rest would be paid by the residents themselves. The government suspended production at 32 of 35 lead plants. The affected area includes people from 10 different villages.

The Zamfara State lead poisoning epidemic occurred in Nigeria in 2010. As of 5 October 2010, at least 400 children have died from the effects of lead poisoning.

=== Sex-specific susceptibility ===
Chronic lead exposure in childhood was shown to be associated with reduced brain mass in an MRI brain scan based study, the reductions in brain size affected the gray matter, and were more pronounced in men.

== Prognosis ==
=== Reversibility ===
The outcome is related to the extent and duration of lead exposure. Effects of lead on the physiology of the kidneys and blood are generally reversible; its effects on the central nervous system are not. While peripheral effects in adults often go away when lead exposure ceases, evidence suggests that most of lead's effects on a child's central nervous system are irreversible. Children with lead poisoning may thus have adverse health, cognitive, and behavioral effects that follow them into adulthood.

=== Encephalopathy ===
Lead encephalopathy is a medical emergency and causes permanent brain damage in 70–80% of children affected by it, even those that receive the best treatment. The mortality rate for people who develop cerebral involvement is about 25%, and of those who survive, who had lead encephalopathy symptoms by the time chelation therapy was begun, about 40% have permanent neurological problems such as cerebral palsy.

=== Long-term ===
Exposure to lead may also decrease lifespan and have health effects in the long term. Death rates from a variety of causes are higher in people with elevated blood lead levels; these include cancer, stroke, heart disease, and general death rates from all causes. Lead is considered a possible human carcinogen based on evidence from animal studies. Evidence also suggests that age-related mental decline and psychiatric symptoms are correlated with lead exposure. Cumulative exposure over a prolonged period may have a more important effect on some aspects of health than recent exposure. Some health effects, such as high blood pressure, are only significant risks when lead exposure is prolonged (over about one year). Furthermore, the neurological effects of lead exposure are exacerbated and long-lasting in low-income children in comparison to those of higher economic standing. This does not imply that being wealthy can prevent lead from causing long-term mental health issues.

== Violence ==
Lead poisoning in children has been linked to changes in brain function that can result in low IQ and increased impulsivity and aggression. These traits of childhood lead exposure are associated with crimes of passion, such as aggravated assault in young adults. An increase in lead exposure in children was linked to an increase in aggravated assault rates 22 years later. For instance, the peak in leaded gasoline use in the late 1970s correlates with a peak in aggravated assault rates in the late 1990s in urban areas across the United States.

== History ==
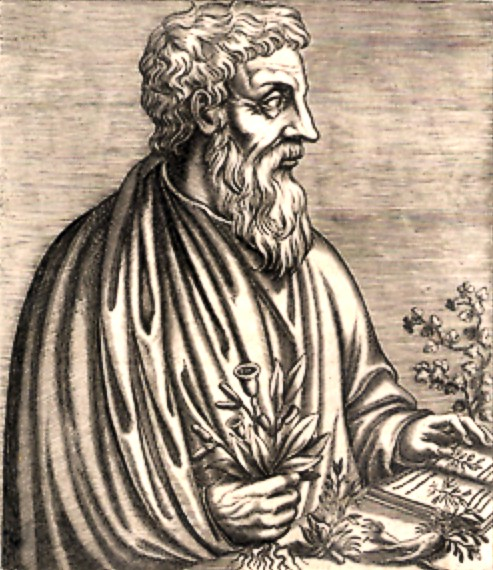
Dioscorides noted lead's effect on the mind in the first century AD.

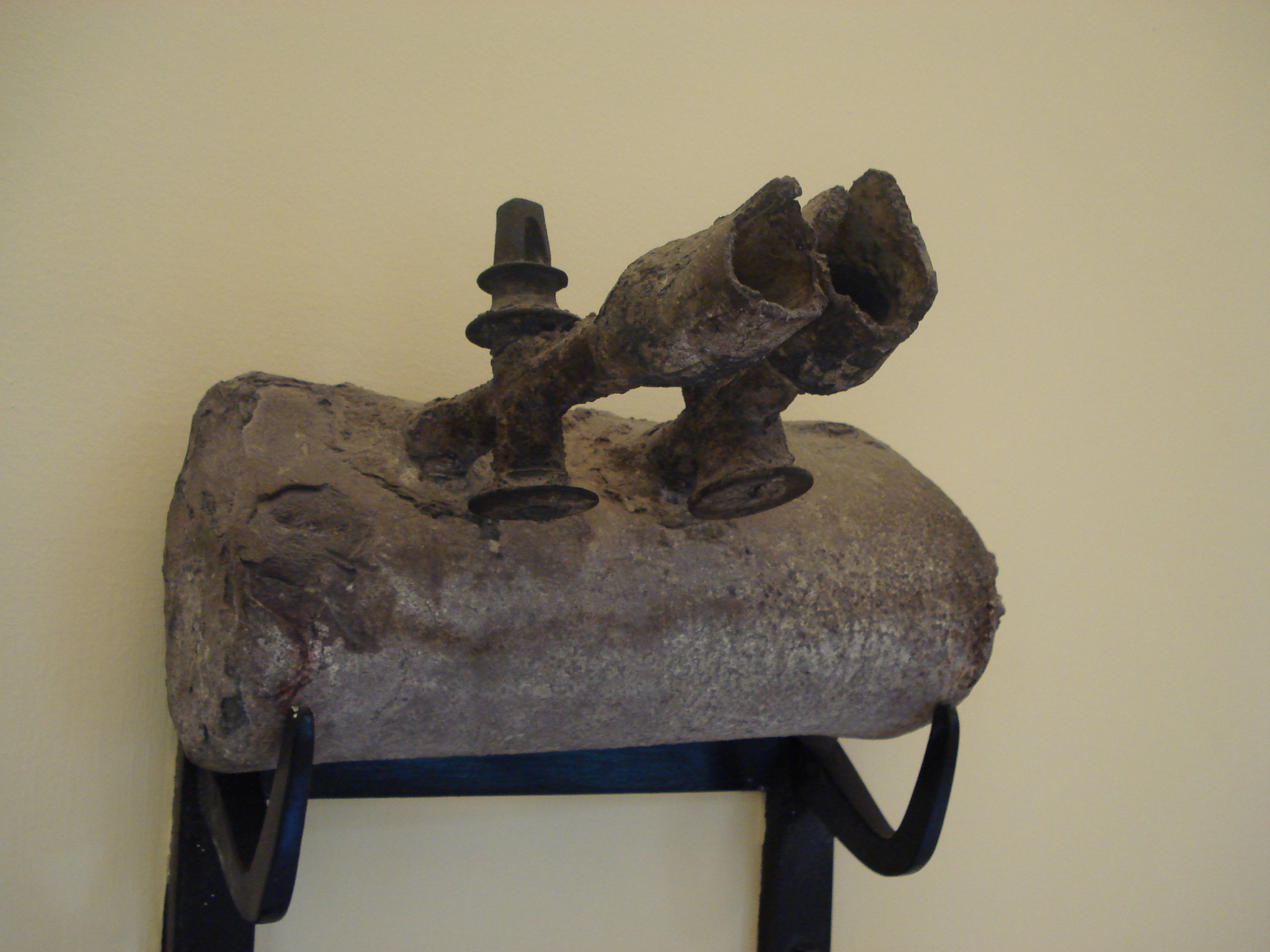
Roman lead water pipes with taps.

Lead poisoning was among the first known and most widely studied work-related environmental hazards. One of the first metals to be smelted and used, lead is thought to have been discovered and first mined in Anatolia around 6500 BC. Its density, workability, and corrosion resistance were among the metal's attractions.

In the 2nd century BC, the Greek botanist Nicander described the colic and paralysis seen in lead-poisoned people. Dioscorides, a Greek physician who lived in the 1st century AD, wrote that lead makes the mind "give way".

Lead was used extensively in Roman aqueducts from about 500 BC to 300 AD. Julius Caesar's engineer, Vitruvius, reported, "water is much more wholesome from earthenware pipes than from lead pipes. For it seems to be made injurious by lead, because white lead is produced by it, and this is said to be harmful to the human body." Gout, prevalent in affluent Rome, is thought to be the result of lead, or leaded eating and drinking vessels. Sugar of lead (lead(II) acetate) was used to sweeten wine, and the gout that resulted from this was known as "saturnine" gout. It is even hypothesized that lead poisoning may have contributed to the decline of the Roman Empire, a hypothesis thoroughly disputed:

The great disadvantage of lead has always been that it is poisonous. This was fully recognised by the ancients, and Vitruvius specifically warns against its use. Because it was nevertheless used in profusion for carrying drinking water, the conclusion has often been drawn that the Romans must therefore have suffered from lead poisoning; sometimes conclusions are carried even further and it is inferred that this caused infertility and other unwelcome conditions, and that lead plumbing was largely responsible for the decline and fall of Rome. Two things make this otherwise attractive hypothesis impossible. First, the calcium carbonate deposit that formed so thickly inside the aqueduct channels also formed inside the pipes, effectively insulating the water from the lead, so that the two never touched. Second, because the Romans had so few taps and the water was constantly running, it was never inside the pipes for more than a few minutes, and certainly not long enough to become contaminated.

Romans also consumed lead through the consumption of defrutum, carenum, and sapa, musts made by boiling down fruit in lead cookware. Defrutum and its relatives were used in ancient Roman cuisine and cosmetics, including as a food preservative. The use of leaden cookware, though popular, was not the general standard and copper cookware was used far more generally. There is also no indication how often sapa was added or in what quantity.

In 1983, environmental chemist Jerome Nriagu argued in a milestone paper that Roman civilization collapsed as a result of lead poisoning. Clair Patterson, the scientist who convinced governments to ban lead from gasoline, enthusiastically endorsed this idea, which nevertheless triggered a volley of publications aimed at refuting it. In 1984, John Scarborough, a pharmacologist and classicist, criticized the conclusions drawn by Nriagu's book as "so full of false evidence, miscitations, typographical errors, and a blatant flippancy regarding primary sources that the reader cannot trust the basic arguments." Although today lead is no longer seen as the prime culprit of Rome's demise, its status in the system of water distribution by lead pipes (fistulæ) still stands as a major public health issue. By measuring Pb isotope compositions of sediments from the Tiber River and the Trajanic Harbor, the present work shows that "tap water" from ancient Rome had 100 times more lead than local spring waters.

A study published in January 2025 concluded that lead pollution during the prosperous Pax Romana period led to cognitive decline and a reduction of IQ in the Roman population.

After antiquity, mention of lead poisoning was absent from medical literature until the end of the Middle Ages. In 1656 the German physician Samuel Stockhausen recognized dust and fumes containing lead compounds as the cause of disease, called since ancient Roman times morbi metallici, that were known to afflict miners, smelter workers, potters, and others whose work exposed them to the metal.

The painter Caravaggio might have died of lead poisoning. Bones with high lead levels were recently found in a grave thought likely to be his. Paints used at the time contained high amounts of lead salts. Caravaggio is known to have exhibited violent behavior, a symptom commonly associated with lead poisoning.

In 17th-century Germany, the physician Eberhard Gockel discovered lead-contaminated wine to be the cause of an epidemic of colic. He had noticed that monks who did not drink wine were healthy, while wine drinkers developed colic, and traced the cause to sugar of lead, made by simmering litharge with vinegar. As a result, Eberhard Ludwig, Duke of Württemberg issued an edict in 1696 banning the adulteration of wines with litharge.

In the 18th century lead poisoning was fairly frequent on account of the widespread drinking of rum, which was made in stills with a lead component (the "worm"). It was a significant cause of mortality amongst slaves and sailors in the colonial West Indies. Lead poisoning from rum was also noted in Boston. Benjamin Franklin suspected lead to be a risk in 1786. Also in the 18th century, "Devonshire colic" was the name given to the symptoms experienced by people of Devon who drank cider made in presses that were lined with lead. Lead was added to cheap wine illegally in the 18th and early 19th centuries as a sweetener. The composer Beethoven, a heavy wine drinker, had elevated lead levels (as later detected in his hair) possibly due to this; lead poisoning is a contender as a factor to his hearing loss and death (cause of which is still controversial).

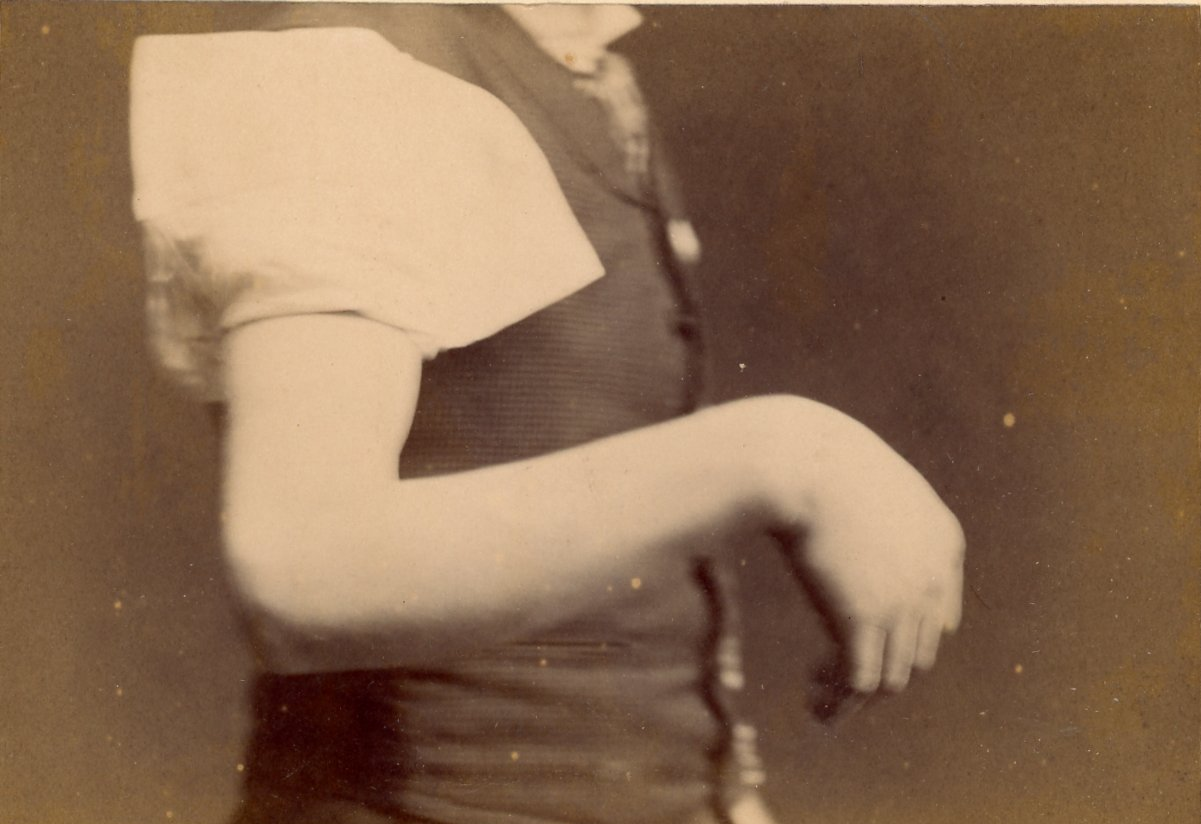
Paralysie saturnine diagnostiquée par Joseph Jules Dejerine et Augusta Dejerine-Klumpke (Sorbonne Université).

With the Industrial Revolution in the 19th century, lead poisoning became common in the work setting. The introduction of lead paint for residential use in the 19th century increased childhood exposure to lead; for millennia before this, most lead exposure had been occupational. The first legislation in the UK to limit pottery workers' exposure to lead was included in the Factories Act Extension Act in 1864, with further introduced in 1899. William James Furnival (1853–1928), research ceramist of City & Guilds London Institute, appeared before Parliament in 1901 and presented a decade's evidence to convince the nation's leaders to remove lead completely from the British ceramic industry. His 852-page treatise, Leadless Decorative Tiles, Faience, and Mosaic of 1904, published that campaign and provided recipes to promote lead-free ceramics. At the request of the Illinois state government in the US, Alice Hamilton (1869–1970) documented lead toxicity in Illinois industry and in 1911 presented results to the 23rd Annual Meeting of the American Economic Association. Hamilton was a founder of the field of occupational safety and health and published the first edition of her manual, Industrial Toxicology, in 1934, yet in print in revised forms.

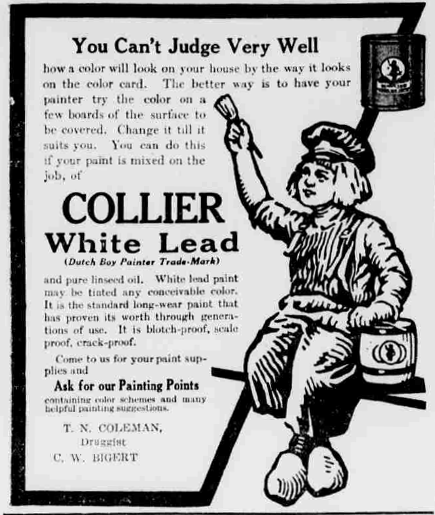
Dutch Boy white lead paint advertisement, 1912.

An important step in the understanding of childhood lead poisoning occurred when toxicity in children from lead paint was recognized in Australia in 1897. France, Belgium, and Austria banned white lead interior paints in 1909; the League of Nations followed suit in 1922. However, in the United States, laws banning lead house paint were not passed until 1971, and it was phased out and not fully banned until 1978.

The 20th century saw an increase in worldwide lead exposure levels due to the increased widespread use of the metal. Beginning in the 1920s, lead was added to gasoline to improve its combustion; lead from this exhaust persists today in soil and dust in buildings. Midcentury ceramicist Carol Janeway provides a case history of lead poisoning in an artist using lead glazes in decorating tiles in the 1940s; her monograph suggests that other artists' potential for lead poisoning be investigated, for example Vally Wieselthier and Dora Carrington. Blood lead levels worldwide have been declining sharply since the 1980s, when leaded gasoline began to be phased out. In those countries that have banned lead in solder for food and drink cans and have banned leaded gasoline additives, blood lead levels have fallen sharply since the mid-1980s.

The levels found today in most people are orders of magnitude greater than those of pre-industrial society. Due to reductions of lead in products and the workplace, acute lead poisoning is rare in most countries today, but low-level lead exposure is still common. It was not until the second half of the 20th century that subclinical lead exposure became understood to be a problem. During the end of the 20th century, the blood lead levels deemed acceptable steadily declined. Blood lead levels once considered safe are now considered hazardous, with no known safe threshold.

In the late 1950s through the 1970s Herbert Needleman and Clair Cameron Patterson did research trying to prove lead's toxicity to humans. In the 1980s Needleman was falsely accused of scientific misconduct by lead industry associates.

In 2002 Tommy Thompson, United States Secretary of Health and Human Services, appointed at least two persons with conflicts of interest to the CDC's Lead Advisory Committee.

In 2014, a case by the State of California against several companies decided against Sherwin-Williams, NL Industries, and ConAgra and ordered them to pay $1.15 billion. The disposition of The People v. ConAgra Grocery Products Company et al. in the California 6th Appellate District Court on 14 November 2017 is that:

... the judgment is reversed, and the matter is remanded to the trial court with directions to (1) recalculate the amount of the abatement fund to limit it to the amount necessary to cover the cost of remediating pre-1951 homes, and (2) hold an evidentiary hearing regarding the appointment of a suitable receiver. The Plaintiff shall recover its costs on appeal.

On 6 December 2017, the petitions for rehearing from NL Industries, Inc., ConAgra Grocery Products Company, and The Sherwin-Williams Company were denied.

Studies have found a weak link between lead from leaded gasoline and crime rates.

As of 2022 in the United States, lead paint in rental housing remains a hazard to children. Both landlords and insurance companies have adopted strategies that limit the chance of recovery for damages due to lead poisoning: insurance companies by excluding coverage for lead poisoning from policies, and landlords by crafting barriers to the collection of any monetary damages compensating plaintiffs for damage.

== Other species ==
Humans are not alone in suffering from lead's effects; plants and animals are also affected by lead toxicity to varying degrees depending on species. Animals experience many of the same effects of lead exposure as humans do, such as abdominal pain, peripheral neuropathy, and behavioral changes such as increased aggression. Much of what is known about human lead toxicity and its effects is derived from animal studies. Animals are used to test the effects of treatments, such as chelating agents, and to provide information on the pathophysiology of lead, such as how it is absorbed and distributed in the body.

Farm animals such as cows and horses as well as pet animals are also susceptible to the effects of lead toxicity. Sources of lead exposure in pets can be the same as those that present health threats to humans sharing the environment, such as paint and blinds, and there is sometimes lead in toys made for pets. Lead poisoning in a pet dog may indicate that children in the same household are at increased risk for elevated lead levels.

=== Wildlife ===
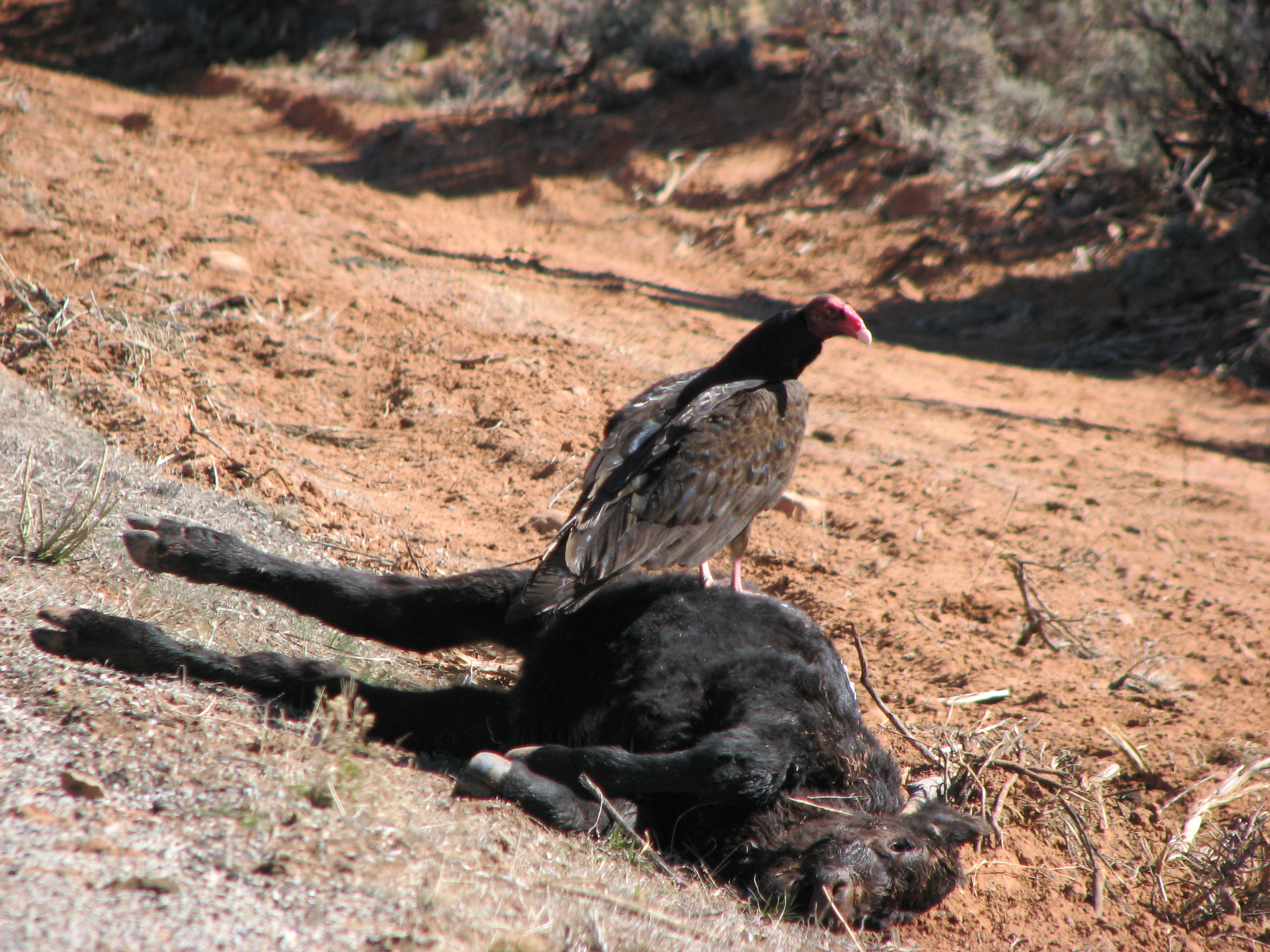
Turkey vultures (Cathartes aura, shown), and California condors can be poisoned when they eat carcasses of animals shot with lead pellets.

Lead, one of the leading causes of toxicity in waterfowl, has been known to cause die-offs of wild bird populations. When hunters use lead shot, waterfowl such as ducks can ingest the spent pellets later and be poisoned; predators that eat these birds are also at risk. Lead shot-related waterfowl poisonings were first documented in the US in the 1880s. By 1919, the spent lead pellets from waterfowl hunting was positively identified as the source of waterfowl deaths. Lead shot has been banned for hunting waterfowl in several countries, including the US in 1991 and Canada in 1997. Other threats to wildlife include lead paint, sediment from lead mines and smelters, and lead weights from fishing lines. Lead in some fishing gear has been banned in several countries.

The critically endangered California condor has also been affected by lead poisoning. As scavengers, condors eat carcasses of game that have been shot but not retrieved, and with them the fragments from lead bullets; this increases their lead levels. Among condors around the Grand Canyon, lead poisoning due to eating lead shot is the most frequently diagnosed cause of death. To protect this species, in areas designated as the California condor's range, the use of projectiles containing lead has been banned to hunt deer, feral pigs, elk, pronghorn antelope, coyotes, ground squirrels, and other non-game wildlife. Also, conservation programs exist that routinely capture condors, check their blood lead levels, and treat cases of poisoning.

=== Other hominin species ===
Ancient hominin species suffered from lead poisoning exposure in lead naturally concentrated in caves. Homo sapiens may have become the surviving species with a genetic mutation that conferred greater lead tolerance in brain functions for language.

== See also ==
- 2015 incidents of lead in drinking water in Hong Kong
- Lead abatement
- Lead Exposure Elimination Project
- Lead production and applications
- Lead-based paint in the United States
- Particulates
- Renovation
- Risk factors of schizophrenia
- Sick building syndrome
- Substance-induced psychosis

== Notes ==
References

- Brunton LL, Goodman LS, Blumenthal D, Buxton I, Parker KL, eds. (2007). "Principles of toxicology". Goodman and Gilman's Manual of Pharmacology and Therapeutics. McGraw-Hill Professional. ISBN 978-0-07-144343-2.
- Casarett LJ, Klaassen CD, Doull J, eds. (2007). "Toxic effects of metals". Casarett and Doull's Toxicology: The Basic Science of Poisons (7th ed.). McGraw-Hill Professional. ISBN 978-0-07-147051-3.
- Chisolm JJ (2004). "Lead poisoning". In Crocetti M, Barone MA, Oski FA (eds.). Oski's Essential Pediatrics (2nd ed.). Lippincott Williams & Wilkins. ISBN 978-0-7817-3770-8.
- Dart RC, Hurlbut KM, Boyer-Hassen LV (2004). "Lead". In Dart RC (ed.). Medical Toxicology (3rd ed.). Lippincott Williams & Wilkins. ISBN 978-0-7817-2845-4.
- Grant LD (2009). "Lead and compounds". In Lippmann M (ed.). Environmental Toxicants: Human Exposures and Their Health Effects (3rd ed.). Wiley-Interscience. ISBN 978-0-471-79335-9.
- Henretig FM (2006). "Lead". In Goldfrank LR (ed.). Goldfrank's Toxicologic Emergencies (8th ed.). McGraw-Hill Professional. ISBN 978-0-07-143763-9.
- Hodge AT (1992). Roman Aqueducts & Water Supply. London: Duckworth. ISBN 978-0-7156-2194-3.
- Kosnett MJ (2005). "Lead". In Brent J (ed.). Critical Care Toxicology: Diagnosis and Management of the Critically Poisoned Patient. Gulf Professional Publishing. ISBN 978-0-8151-4387-1.
- Kosnett MJ (2007). "Heavy metal intoxication and chelators". In Katzung BG (ed.). Basic and Clinical Pharmacology. McGraw-Hill Professional. ISBN 978-0-07-145153-6.
- Kosnett MJ (2006-09-18). "Lead". In Olson KR (ed.). Poisoning and Drug Overdose (5th ed.). McGraw-Hill Professional. p. 2006. ISBN 978-0-07-144333-3.
- Menkes JH (2006). "Toxic and nutritional disorders". In Menkes JH, Sarnat HB, Maria BL (eds.). Child Neurology (7th ed.). Lippincott Williams & Wilkins. p. 706. ISBN 978-0-7817-5104-9.
- Merrill JG, Morton JJ, Soileau SD (2007). "Metals". In Hayes AW (ed.). Principles and Methods of Toxicology (5th ed.). CRC Press. ISBN 978-0-8493-3778-9.
- Mycyk M, Hryhorczuk D, Amitai Y (2005). "Lead". In Erickson TB, Ahrens WR, Aks S, Ling L (eds.). Pediatric Toxicology: Diagnosis and Management of the Poisoned Child. McGraw-Hill Professional. ISBN 978-0-07-141736-5.
- Olson KR (2007). "Poisoning". In McPhee SJ, Tierney LM, Papadakis MA (eds.). Current Medical Diagnosis and Treatment (46th ed.). McGraw-Hill Professional. ISBN 978-0-07-147247-0.
- Pearson HA, Schonfeld DJ (2003). "Lead". In Rudolph CD (ed.). Rudolph's Pediatrics (21st ed.). McGraw-Hill Professional. ISBN 978-0-8385-8285-5.
- Rambousek AJ, ed. (2008). "The symptoms and treatment of industrial poisoning". Industrial Poisoning from Fumes, Gases, and Poisons of Manufacturing Processes. READ BOOKS. ISBN 978-1-4086-7025-5.
- Rubin R, Strayer DS, eds. (2008). "Environmental and nutritional pathology". Rubin's Pathology: Clinicopathologic Foundations of Medicine (5th ed.). Lippincott Williams & Wilkins. ISBN 978-0-7817-9516-6.
- Salvato JA, Nemerow NL, Agardy FJ, eds. (2003). "Noninfectious and noncommunicable diseases and conditions associated with the environment, including air, water, and food". Environmental Engineering (5th ed.). John Wiley and Sons. ISBN 978-0-471-41813-9.
- Trevor AJ, Katzung BG, Masters SB, eds. (2007). "Heavy metals". Katzung & Trevor's Pharmacology: Examination & Board Review (8th ed.). McGraw-Hill Professional. ISBN 978-0-07-148869-3.
- Yu MH (2005). "Soil and water pollution: Environmental metals and metalloids". Environmental Toxicology: Biological and Health Effects of Pollutants. CRC Press. ISBN 978-1-56670-670-4.
