= Adult Blood Lead Epidemiology and Surveillance =

The US National Institute for Occupational Safety and Health funds the Adult Blood Lead Epidemiology and Surveillance (ABLES) program, a state-based surveillance program of laboratory-reported adult blood lead levels. In 2009, the ABLES program updated its case definition for an Elevated Blood Lead Level to a blood lead concentration equal or greater than 10 micrograms per deciliter (10 μg/dL). This chart shows CDC/NIOSH/ABLES Elevated blood lead level case definition in perspective.

The public health objective of the ABLES program is identical to the Occupational Safety and Health objective 7 in Healthy People 2020, which is to reduce the rate of adults (age 16 or older) who have BLLs ≥ 10 μg/dL. The ABLES program aims to accomplish this objective by providing guidance, technical support, and funding to build state capacity to initiate or improve adult blood lead surveillance programs which can accurately measure trends in adult BLLs and which can effectively target interventions to prevent lead exposures.

== Impact ==
In the United States, approximately 95% of BLLs ≥25 μg/dL in adults are work related. Lead exposure occurs mainly in the battery manufacturing, lead and zinc ore mining, and painting and paper hanging industries. In 2008, OSHA updated its National Emphasis Program for Lead to reduce occupational exposures by targeting unsafe conditions or high hazard industries. OSHA utilized national ABLES program data to identify those industries where elevated BLLs indicated a need for increased national focus. State ABLES programs also work with OSHA by sharing lead exposure data, which OSHA then uses to initiate investigations and promote prevention interventions.

Over the last 17 years, a 50% decrease in the national prevalence rates of BLL ≥25 μg/dL has been documented using ABLES surveillance data. In 1994 the rate was 14.0 employed adults per 100,000; in 2010 the rate was reduced to 7.0. In 2010, 40 state ABLES programs that provided data reported 31,081 adults with BLLs ≥10 μg/dL. Among these, 8,793 had BLLs ≥25 μg/dL, and 1,388 had BLLs ≥40 μg/dL. Based on data from 37 reporting states, ABLES established the 2010 baseline rate for Healthy People 2020 objective to reduce adult lead exposure. This 2010 baseline rate for BLLs ≥10 μg/dL is 26.4 adults per 100,000 employed adults.

Though rates of BLL ≥25 μg/dL have decreased, the work to prevent elevated BLLs is still far from complete. The ABLES data from 2010 establish that lead exposure remains a national occupational health problem, and that continued efforts to reduce lead exposures are needed. Because BLLs are often not available for many lead-exposed workers (e.g., the workers may not be tested or their tests may not be reported to public health authorities), ABLES data should be considered a low estimate of the true magnitude of elevated adult lead exposures in the United States.

== Health effects ==
Elevated blood lead levels (BLLs) in adults can damage the nervous, hematologic, reproductive, renal, cardiovascular, and gastrointestinal systems.

Current research continues to find harmful effects in adults at BLLs previously considered harmless, such as decreased renal function associated with BLLs at 5 micrograms per deciliter (μg/dL) and lower, and increased risk of hypertension and essential tremor at BLLs below 10 μg/dL.

U.S. Department of Health and Human Services recommends that BLLs among all adults be reduced to <10 μg/dL. OSHA Lead Standards require medical removal from lead exposures only after a construction worker's BLL reaches or exceeds 50 μg/dL or a general industry worker's BLL reaches or exceeds 60 μg/dL. The geometric mean BLL of all adults in the United States was 1.2 μg/dL in 2009–2010.

== Workers with elevated blood lead levels ==
In the U.S. the majority of cases are workplace-related. During 2008–2009, the greatest proportions of adults with elevated BLLs were employed in three main industry sectors:manufacturing, 72.1% in 2008 and 72.3% in 2009; construction, 13.2% in 2008 and 14.4% in 2009; and mining, 6.6% in 2008 and 5.1% in 2009. Industry subsectors with the highest numbers of workers with elevated BLLs were manufacturing of storage batteries, secondary smelting and refining of nonferrous metals, and painting and paper hanging. Industry subsectors with the greatest proportions of adults with BLLs ≥40 μg/dL among adults with BLLs ≥25 μg/dL were painting and paper hanging; bridge, tunnel, and elevated highway construction; copper foundries; special trade contractors; and heavy construction industries.

== Program description ==
ABLES state interventions to prevent lead over-exposures include: (1) conducting follow-up interviews with physicians, employers, and workers; (2) investigating work sites; (3) providing technical assistance; (4) providing referrals for consultation and/or enforcement; and (5) developing and disseminating educational materials and outreach programs.

ABLES states are required to have a mandatory state requirement that laboratories report blood lead level results to the state health department or designee. The lowest blood lead level to be reported varies from state to state.

Lead may be taken home from the workplace on clothes or in cars potentially exposing spouses and children. Children who come in contact with lead-exposed workers should be targeted for blood lead screening.

== State ABLES programs ==
ABLES' success is based on its longstanding strategic partnerships with state ABLES programs, federal agencies, and worker affiliated organizations.

The NIOSH ABLES program partners with 40 funded states and one state that participates with no ABLES funding: Alabama, Alaska, Arizona, California, Colorado, Connecticut, Florida, Georgia, Hawaii, Illinois, Indiana, Iowa, Kansas, Kentucky, Louisiana, Maine, Maryland, Massachusetts, Michigan, Maine, Missouri, Montana, Nebraska, New Hampshire, New Jersey, New Mexico, New York, North Carolina, Ohio, Oklahoma, Oregon, Pennsylvania, Rhode Island, South Carolina, Tennessee, Texas, Utah, Vermont, Washington, Wisconsin, and Wyoming.

ABLES began in 1987 with four states and has continued to grow to include forty-one states in 2010.

== See also ==
- Lead poisoning
- Lead safe work practices
- Lead-based paint in the United States
