= Samuel Stockhausen =

German physician of the 17th century

Samuel Stockhausen was a German physician in the mining town of Goslar. He studied the ancient miner's disease, called Hüttenkatze, among workers in the nearby mines of Rammelsberg in the Harz mountains. In 1656 he published a book, in Latin, attributing the disease to noxious fumes from litharge (a lead compound), Libellus de lithargyrii fumo noxio morbifico, ejusque metallico frequentiori morbo vulgò dicto die Hütten Katze oder Hütten Rauch ("Treatise on the Noxious Fumes of Litharge, Diseases caused by them and Miners' Asthma"). Because of this he is considered by some to be the first occupational physician. Unlike his near contemporary, Paracelsus, who also wrote about diseases of miners, Stockhausen recognized litharge-derived dust as the causative factor and recommended avoiding inhaling it. This was the first time that the ancient syndrome, known to Romans as morbi metallici, was attributed specifically to chronic poisoning with lead.

The work of Stockhausen influenced Eberhard Gockel to attribute the consumption of litharge in wine as causing a similar disease.
