= Wolfgang Gockel =

Wolfgang Gockel (21 November 1945 – 3 March 2005) was a German archaeologist, best known for his efforts at deciphering the Mayan hieroglyphs.

Gockel was born in Rönsahl, a small town in North Rhine-Westphalia. After completing his schooling in Bochum, he began an apprenticeship as a machinist. He soon left the apprenticeship to qualify as an able bodied seaman, with which he traveled the world (1963–1969). It was during this time that he began his interest in archaeology.

Gockel served in the German Bundeswehr (1969–1975), eventually becoming a helicopter pilot. In 1975, he completed his university qualifying examination and began his studies of archaeology in Cologne, Bonn and Göttingen, with a concentration on the near east, Assyriology and classical archaeology. He completed his M.A. in 1979 with a thesis on sculpture in Mesopotamia and Elam from the early Sumerian to the early dynastic period. During his studies of "Altamerikanistik" (pre-Columbian ethnology) at the "Völkerkunde-Institut" in Bonn (1975–1977), he was introduced to the problem of reading the Mayan hieroglyphs, which would occupy him till the end of his life.

After completing his degree, Gockel was engaged as a tour guide and free-lance archaeologist working on excavations and special projects for museums and private collectors. While working on one such (totally unrelated) project at the Uffizi Gallery in Florence in the Spring of 1987, Gockel spent his evenings puzzling over the Mayan hieroglyphs. He quickly developed a new approach which he found extremely promising and commenced work on a decipherment of the dynastic inscriptions at the ruined Mayan city of Palenque in Chiapas, Mexico.

Gockel's work, which was ready for publication in the Fall of 1988, created a furor - partially because his results disagreed radically with those of other scholars and partially because he chose to make his work public first in the popular German weekly magazine Stern, which the other major German news sources regarded with some skepticism. The prestigious Süddeutsche Zeitung took a more positive view.

The scholarly publication was reviewed negatively in Spektrum der Wissenschaft, the German edition of Scientific American, with replies to the review by Gockel and one of the referees who approved the Stern publication. A scheduled conference at the Roemer- und Pelizaeus-Museum in Hildesheim, where Gockel was to face his critics, did not materialize.

Gockel's Palenque book was translated into Spanish and published in Mexico in 1995. The Spanish edition and some manuscript drafts of uncompleted work have only recently become available online.

In addition to his work on the decipherment of the Maya hieroglyphs, Gockel published a number of works on Latin America and the Middle East.

Wolfgang Gockel died at his home in Helsinki, Finland, on 3 March 2005.

== Major publications ==
- Die Geschichte einer Maya-Dynastie. Entzifferung klassischer Maya-Hieroglyphen am Beispiel der Inschriften von Palenque, 1988, Mainz:Verlag Philipp von Zabern.
- Historia de una dinastía Maya. El desciframiento de los jeroglíficos mayas de acuerdo con las inscriptiones de Palenque, 1995, Mexico, D.F.: Editorial Diana
- Syrie, Libanon, 1988, München: Nelles Verlag. [English and French translation available].
- Mexiko, Das zentrale Hochland und Yucatán-Von den Stätten der Maya und Azteken zu barokken Kirchen und Konventen, 1998, Köln: DuMont (3ed, 2005).
- Guatemala, Belize, Honduras und El Salvador, Maya-Städte und Kolonialarchitektur in Mittelamerika, 1999, Köln: DuMont.
- Irak, Sumerische Tempel, Babylons Paläste und heilige Stätten des Islam im Zweistromland, 2001, Köln: DuMont.
