= Eberhard Gockel =

German physician (1636–1703)

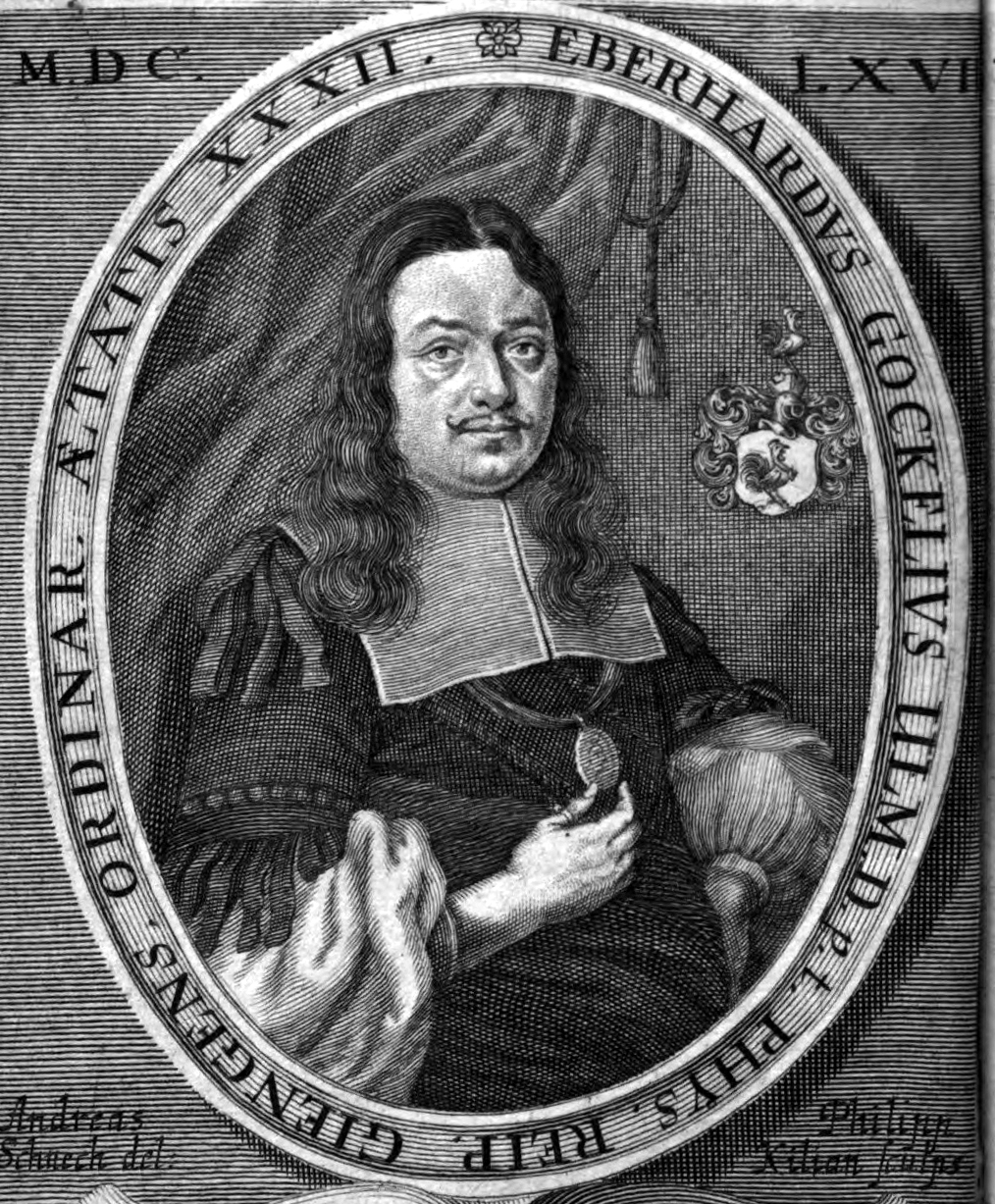
- Eberhard Gockel, 32 years old.
- Born: 1636
- Died: 1703 (aged 66–67)
- Occupations: City physician, personal physician
- Known for: Making the connection between the use of lead in wine and lead poisoning symptoms

Eberhard Gockel (also Eberhard Göckel; 1636–1703) was a German city physician, personal physician (Leibarzt) to the Duke of Württemberg, and member of the German National Academy of Sciences Leopoldina. He is known for discovering the link between lead poisoning, historically known as dry colic, morbi metallici, and colica Pictonum, and the consumption of lead through lead-sweetened wine.

== Life ==
Gockel was born in 1636 in Ulm, Germany, to Johann Georg Gockel and Maria Eberhardina. His father was city physician (Stadtphysicus) in Ulm. After completing his studies at sixteen, he studied medicine in Tübingen and Basel, receiving his doctorate in 1656. He was a physician in Waiblingen, later in Giengen, and finally in Ulm, where he also worked as the personal physician to the Duke of Württemberg–Weiltingen.

Gockel was a proponent of iatrochemistry and wrote about illnesses caused by werewolves and magic. He authored a number of works, including on Leopoldina members Daniel Sennert and Christian Franz Paullini.

In 1656 Gockel married Maria Barbara Ruoff. The couple had 18 children, including sons Christopher Erasmus Gockel, a physician and Johann Christoph Gockel, a physician and pharmacist.

In 1685, Gockel was accepted as a member of the German National Academy of Sciences Leopoldina with the epithet ALECTOR (member number 129).

Gockel died in Ulm in 1703.

== Discovery of lead poisoning ==
Since Ancient Roman times, lead in the form of litharge or sugar of lead had been used to sweeten wine or balance its acidity. Sweetening wine in this manner was a common practice in Ulm in Gockel's day in order to compensate for poor quality grapes. However, the connection between the ill-effects of lead on the body – known by multiple names: Latin morbi metallici and colica Pictonum and English dry colic – and consumption of lead was not known. Symptoms of lead poisoning had traditionally been thought to be due to an imbalance in the humors. In the 1600s, a number of outbreaks of lead poisoning occurred. The severe 'colic of Poitou, France' was described by the physician of Cardinal Richelieu but the cause was unknown. In 1694 it struck two monasteries Gockel was responsible for. Several people at the monastery fell ill and died not long after dining together on Christmas. After having been served wine himself while visiting the monastery, he became sick with fever and severe pain. He noted that those who had not consumed the wine were unaffected. The event led him to discover sediment in the bottom of the wine barrel and that a local wine merchant had been adding litharge, lead oxide, to the wine, causing lead poisoning symptoms. In 1697, Gockel published a paper on the cause of "wine disease". He credited Samuel Stockhausen's 1656 work describing the symptoms of lead poisoning among miners, then known as Hüttenkatze. Other local physicians reached the same conclusion, and Eberhard Louis, Duke of Württemberg, banned the addition of litharge to wine in 1696.

== Writings ==
- Discursus Politico–Historico–Medicus De Ira, Oder Politische, Historische, und Medicinische Betrachtung deß Zorns, und deren darauß entspringenden Unfällen, Schadens und mannigfaltigen Kranckheiten. Auch wie demselben zu begegnen und abzuhelffen seye? (1667). Fick, Nördlingen. (1668) Leipzig.
- Epitome theorico-practica de odontalgia, oder ein kurtzer iedoch aigentlicher Bericht von dem Zahnwehe : aus waserley Ursachen dasselbige entspringe, auch wie von solchem, vermittelst der natürlichen Mitteln, zu begegnen seye (1668) Nördlingen.
- Enchiridion medico-practicum de peste atque ejus origine, causis et +& signis prognosticis, quin etiam praeservationis ac curationis modo et +& antidotis (1669). Goebel, Augustae Vindelicorum.
- Kurtzer Bericht von denen wüetenden Hunds-Bissen. Was dieselbe eigentlich für eine Beschaffenheit haben, was für Schaden und Unheil darauß erfolge … (1679). Göbel, Augsburg.
- Consilia medicinales : decades sex … (1683). Augusta Vindelicorum.
- Der eyerlegende Hahn, sampt seinem jüngst-gelegten Hahnen- oder Basilisken-Ey : das ist, eine kurtze und curiose Beschreibung des Gockelhahnens insgemein, seiner Art, Natur und Eigenschafft... auch seines Nutzens in der Artzney ; neben einer gründlichen Deduction... etlicher curioser und nachdencklicher Fragen von dem Hahnen- oder Basilisken-Ey... (1697). Kühn, Ulm.
- Eine curiose Beschreibung deß an. 1694. 95. und 96. durch das Silberglett versüßten sauren Weins und der davon entstandenen neuen und vormahls unerhörten Wein-Kranckheit : ... samt denen Artzney-Mitteln, welche hierwider fruchtbarlich zu gebrauchen seyn ; mit angehencktem Bericht wie der durch schädliche Mittel gestrichene und verfälschte Wein zu probiren und zu erkennen seye ... (1697). Kühn, Ulm.
- Tractatus Polyhistoricus Magico-Medicus Curiosus : oder ein kurtzer, mit vielen verwunderlichen Historien untermengter Bericht von dem Beschreyen und Verzaubern, auch denen darauß entspringenden Kranckheiten und zauberischen Schäden ... (1699). Kroniger [et al], Franckfurt [et al]; (1717) Hagen, Franckfurt; Leipzig.
- Gallicinium medico-practicum (1700). Ulm.
- Brief an Septimus Andreas Fabricius
