= Burglar sign =

Supposed practice of marking houses for burglary

A burglar sign is a marking supposedly left on or near a property by a burglar or their accomplice, signalling in code that the building is vulnerable or unoccupied.

The practice is considered to be an urban legend, with Snopes commenting that publicly creating such signs would be an unnecessary additional risk for the burglar, when they could instead simply note down details of addresses. Those wishing to communicate property information to an accomplice could do so more easily by other channels, without making the same information available to other criminals.

== Chalk symbols ==
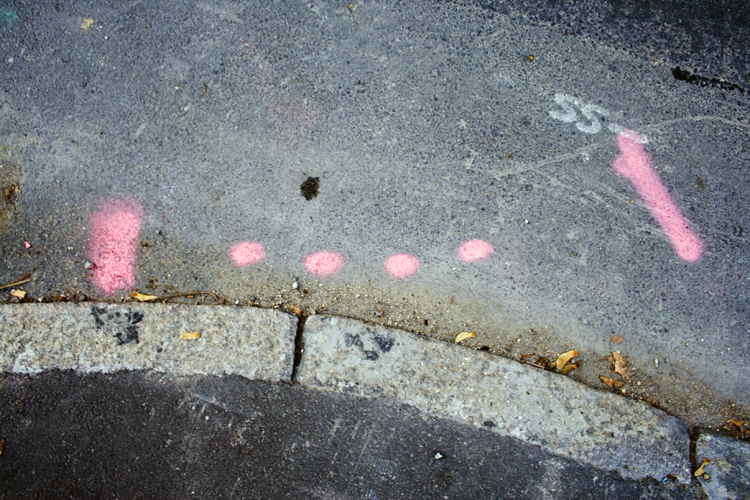
Chalk paint symbols made by a utility company on a road surface

In 2016, there were reports in different regions of the United Kingdom of mysterious symbols being chalked and painted onto roads, kerbs and walls. Social media posts described the markings as being a criminal code to indicate messages such as "nothing worth stealing" or "wealthy homeowner", and some local police forces distributed leaflets repeating this explanation to residents.

West Mercia Police investigated the reports and concluded that the markings had been placed by utility firms to mark power lines, water pipes and similar features, prior to commencing work at a site.

== Stickers ==
In 2013, stories began to circulate in Australia and later the United Kingdom of dog thieves using coloured stickers or bags tied in trees to mark properties from which dogs could be stolen at a future date. RSPCA Australia described the social media posts as a "viral hoax", a conclusion that was also reached by police in Whitby, England, who had received reports of coloured stickers being placed on car tyres outside properties, which they explained were placed there as part of the tyre manufacturing process.

== Locksmith stickers ==
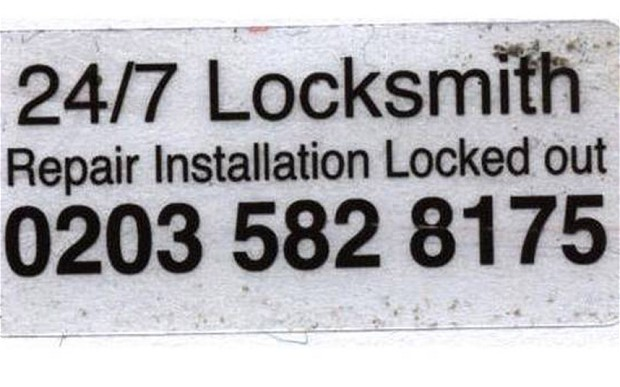
A locksmith sticker with an unresponsive number that police believed to have been used by criminals in London in 2013

Stories have appeared in the British media reporting that burglars were placing emergency locksmith stickers on properties to mark them as vulnerable, or unoccupied during the day, having checked the building's security while pretending to deliver marketing material. Having placed a sticker, the burglar can then return to break into the property at a later time.

The stickers typically advertise the services of a locksmith. Such stickers are not necessarily an indicator of impending burglary, as locksmiths have placed these stickers on doors and doorframes since at least the 1980s as a way to gain business, by giving locked-out property owners a readily available number to call.

In 2013, a spokesman for Wandsworth Council spoke of "growing evidence" that organised burglars may have been using the method to target homes in South London. Responding to an incident in the area, the Metropolitan Police said that "We are only aware of one burglary, in Wandsworth, at a property that has a sticker. However, we cannot confirm the property was burgled because it had a sticker."

== Other ==
In September 2023, North Wales Police said that they were aware of reports of burglars placing garden gnomes in front gardens, to see whether the residents would remove them and confirm that the property was actively occupied.

== See also ==
- Locksmith scam
- Hobo signs
- Warchalking
