= Topcoat =

Topcoat may refer to:

- a type of overcoat
- Guard hair, the outer layer of hair of most mammals
- the coat of paint on top of the primer

== See also ==
- Coating, a covering applied to the surface of an object
