= Soy paint =

Paint made primarily from soybeans

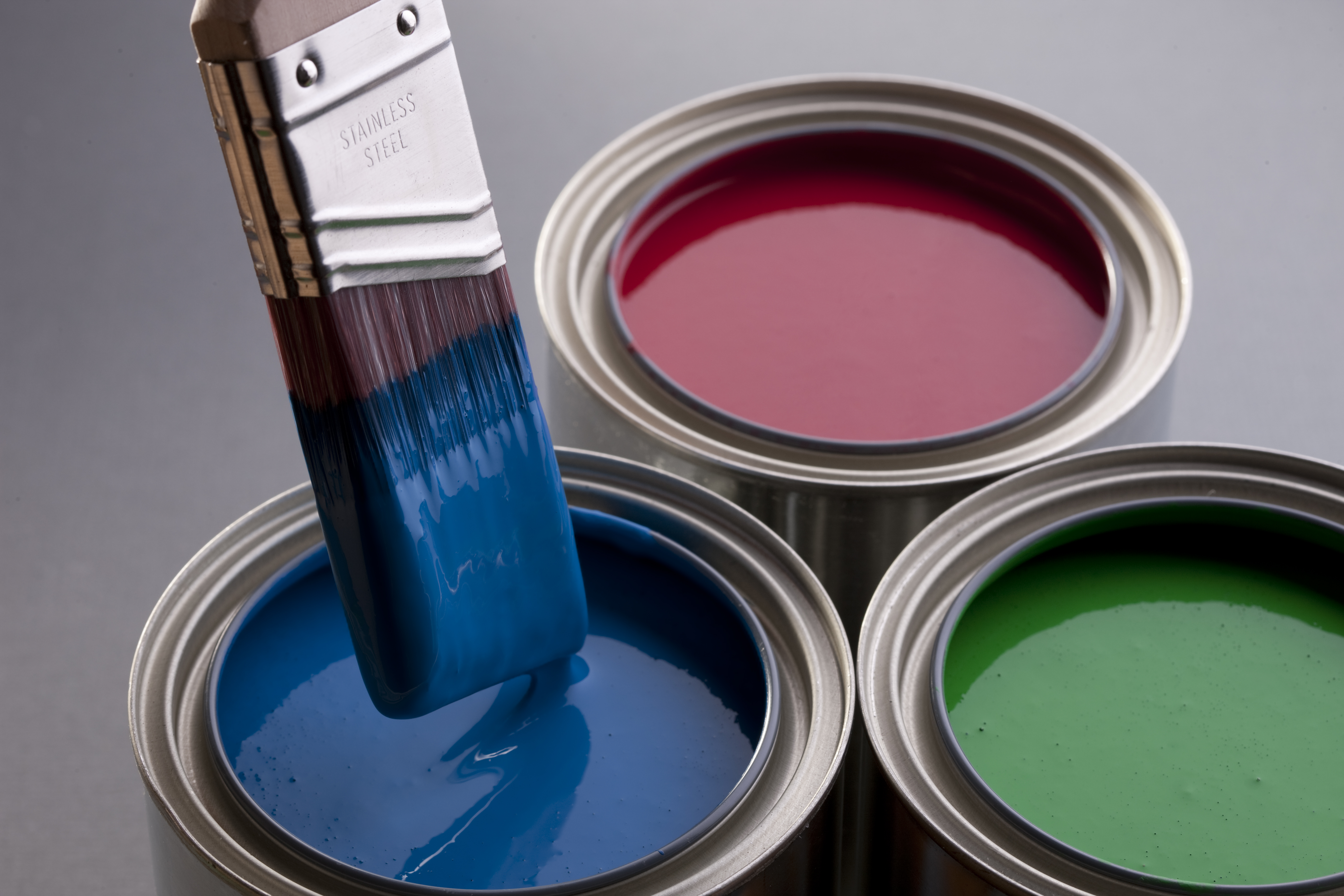
Cans of soy paint

Soy paint is paint made primarily from soy. It combines the advantage of being a renewable resource with the potential of non-toxic product.

== Oil ==
Soy oils have been used in paint since at least the early 1900s, with paint being the second largest market for the oil in the United States between 1914 and 1918. Soy oil was an early runner to replace linseed oil in paint products but did not transition fully, in part as it was attractive as a food product. In 1933 Robert Boyer developed an enamel soy paint which was used on Ford automobiles. Soy oil was attractive to manufacturers because of its very good drying quantities.

== Latex ==
Soy flour or protein is used in latex type (water based) paints as a replacement for casein. Some manufacturers have shown a renewed interest in Soy paints for its low VOC and general Green building attributes. At least one manufacture in 2009 was selling a non-toxic 0 VOC soy paint product.

== See also ==
- Soy ink
