= Locksmith scam =

Scam targeting people locked out of cars or buildings

The locksmith scam is a scam involving fake business listings for cheap locksmith services that, once called out, overcharge the customer. The scam targets people who call a locksmith out of desperation, usually because of being locked out of their car or premises. Locksmith scams have been reported in the United States, the United Kingdom, and New Zealand.

The scams work by flooding business-finding services with a multitude of faux business listings. All of the phone numbers of these listings eventually link back to a single operation, usually without a legitimate address or license. The descriptions will be similar to legitimate locksmiths, accompanied by similarly misleading advertising, and usually quoting an unusually low price. The person who turns up may perform shoddy work and then overcharge for the service and parts. Since the customer never knows the real business or people involved, at best they can ask for a single phone listing to be removed - a process that takes time and does not negatively impact the scammer much, as they can simply create more fake listings.

Side-effects of the scam include damage to legitimate locksmiths who lose business and tend to get angry calls from people believing them to be responsible. Google Maps has been particularly vulnerable to this operation in the 2010s. It began requiring people advertising locksmith services in the US or Canada to complete its "Advanced Verification" process as of 2018, but does not do so in other markets.

== Structure ==
=== Lead generation ===
Such scams rely on lead generation, designed to confuse potential customers into believing that the scammer is a legitimate, but low-priced, locksmith, for example by:

- Creating websites, search engine advertisements and business directory listings designed to resemble those of legitimate locksmiths.
- Using retouched photographs depicting locksmith stores at locations where no store actually exists.
- Procuring dishonest reviews.
- Using names similar or identical to those of legitimate locksmiths.
- Using addresses that are either fictitious, or are P. O. boxes, or belong to an existing home or business (sometimes, but not always, a locksmith business).
- Driving up the price of online advertisements to make them unaffordable for legitimate locksmiths. (Locksmiths businesses are among those worst affected by click fraud.)
- Calls being routed to a call centre, rather than to an actual locksmith.
- Advertising, or the call centre quoting, unrealistically low prices, together with the caveat, "and up".

=== Lead conversion ===
The scams then use a "conversion funnel", in which the mark is bluntly persuaded to part with money. Signs that this may be happening include:

- Using vehicles that have no signage or only magnetic stick-on signage, to reduce accountability.
- Using staff lacking identification or uniforms, again to reduce accountability.
- Disinterest in the customer's right to access the vehicle or building to which the call-out relates; for example, failing to ask the customer for ID or proof of ownership.
- Refusing to provide a written estimate, also to reduce accountability.
- Insisting upon the use of destructive rather than non-destructive entry, typically by destroying the original lock and necessitating the purchase of a replacement lock.
- Charging excessive prices, even if low prices were advertised or quoted by the call centre (i.e. bait-and-switch).
- Insisting upon payment by cash or debit card (because if paid by credit card, the charges are potentially reversible).

== Legal action ==
Locksmiths and other observers have noted that search engine companies make substantial income from paid-for listings, regardless of whether the listings are legitimate or spam. Writing in 2016, Cory Doctorow claimed that "Nearly every locksmith that appears on Google Maps is a fake business that redirects to a call center ... that dispatches a scammy, distant, barely trained locksmith who'll come and charge you 5-10 times more than you were quoted."

In the U.S. in 2005, a Bronx-based company was sued by the Chicago Department of Consumer services for alleged consumer fraud.

In the U.S. in 2009, three alleged locksmith scammers were unsuccessfully prosecuted in St. Louis.

In the U.K. in 2010, a locksmith scammer was successfully prosecuted.

In the U.S. in 2014, a locksmith based in Virginia sued Google, Yellowbook (Hibu), and Ziplocal, under numerous laws, requesting that those companies "remove fraudulent locksmith listings from their search results". This, too, was unsuccessful, due to the companies' immunity under the Communications Decency Act.

In the U.S. in 2017–2018, a group of 14 locksmiths filed a lawsuit against Google, Yahoo, and Bing, alleging that these search engines allowed spam listings to drown out legitimate, organic search results. This class action was dismissed by the US Court of Appeals in Washington DC in 2019.

In the U.S in 2025, Google has uncovered and removed over 10,000 fraudulent business listings from Google Maps, targeting urgent service industries like locksmiths and towing companies. The company announced a lawsuit against an alleged scammer who created and sold fake profiles.

In Eastwood v. Atlas Locksmith Solutions, et al., Atlas disclosed that it subscribed to 115 telephone numbers in the Phoenix Metropolitan Market, assigned each of those numbers to an address where Atlas had no location or legitimate business interest, then multiplied those phone number/address combinations by 10 different company names on a spreadsheet causing Veritel (a now defunct telephone company run by Clay Van Doren) to publish 1,150 separate and distinct fraudulent telephone listings all promulgated and distributed to consumers by Google, Yahoo, and distributed on a wholesale basis by information brokers including Acxiom and others.

Google says that it has removed billions of advertisements that violated its policies, and claims to have improved its verification systems to combat listings fraud. However, although Google now requires people advertising locksmith services in the US or Canada to complete its "Advanced Verification" process, it does not do so in other markets. Also, Google has reportedly resisted removing fraudulent listings.

== See also ==
- Adversarial information retrieval
- Criticism of Google
- Deregulation
- Hijacked journal
- Misinformation
- Passing off
- Sybil attack
- Typosquatting
