= Roof coating =

Roof material

A roof coating is a monolithic, fully adhered, fluid applied roofing membrane. Many roof coatings are elastomeric, that is, they have elastic properties that allow them to stretch and return to their original shape without damage.

Typical roof coating dry film thickness vary from paint film thickness (plus-or-minus 0.075 mm (3 dry mils) to more than 1 mm (40 dry mils). This means a roof coating actually becomes the top layer of a composite roof membrane and underlying system. As such, the roof coating is the topmost layer of protection for the membrane, receiving the impact of sunlight (both infrared and ultraviolet (UV)), rain, hail, and physical damage.

== Benefits ==
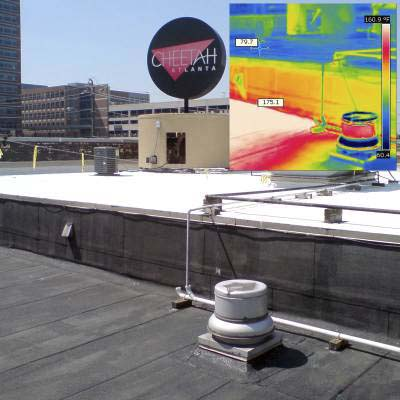
A 35 °C (95 °F) heat reduction was observed on this modified bitumen roof with a white, reflective roof coating.

Roof coatings are seamless and when installed correctly, can solve roof leaks on almost any type of roofing material.

There are exceptions: "professionals do not recommend using cool coatings over existing shingles. This technique can cause moisture problems and water damage because the coating can inhibit normal shingle drying after rain or dew accumulation, allowing water to condense and collect under the shingles."

Field-applied reflective roof coatings can extend the useful life of nearly every roof substrate keeping a roof surface cool and providing a level of protection from the sun and weather.

However, coating asphalt shingles and built-up composition roofs requires more caution. The National Roofing Contractors Association’s (NRCA) director of technical services has stated "The roofing industry is aware of a number of issues that could have negative consequences for field application of coatings over asphalt shingle roof systems. Anyone considering this type of application should be aware of the concerns so they can weigh them against the benefits claimed in coating product promotional materials."

Roof coatings can add 25 years to the service life of a roof and reduce the amount of discarded roofing materials that end up in landfills. The infrared image on the right shows 79 °C (174 °F) on the uncoated (black) section of the modified bitumen roof. The coated (white) section is 26 °C (79 °F). Field studies have shown that cool roof coatings can lower rooftop temperatures and reduce air conditioning bills.

== Limitations/Risks ==
Most flat roofs are not perfectly sloped, causing water to puddle in some areas, in particular around the drains and scuppers. Many roof coatings are not rated or warranted for "ponding water", and thus might fail pre-maturely if exposed to standing water over long periods of time. Serious consideration should be given to the performance and limitations of the coating being selected. Some manufacturers will warranty their coatings including ponding water. Typically, manufacturers for acrylic roof coatings do not include warranties for ponding water, while some polyurethane and silicone roof coatings manufacturers will.

== Types of Roof Coatings ==
There are many different types of roof coatings with various purposes, formulated with various chemistries. The primary purposes of roof coatings are: resaturation of old roofs to extend the service life of the roof, reflectivity to create a "cool roof", and toughness to provide a wearing surface on the roof that can resist abrasion from foot traffic or other physical damage, such as from hail. Primary materials used in roof coating formulation include acrylics, asphalt, butyl, coal tar pitch, polyurea, polyurethanes, polyvinylidene fluoride, silicones, and styrene-butadiene.

== Application ==
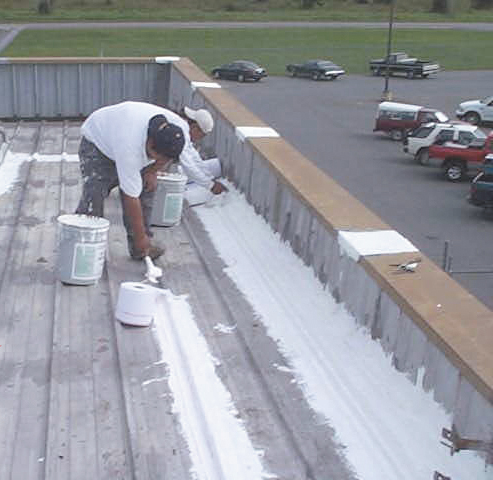
Prepping the seams on a Metal Roof Prior to the Application of a Roof Coating

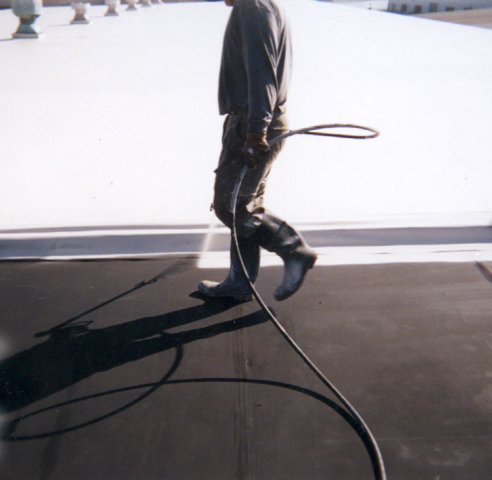
Top coating a commercial flat roof with a cool roof test

Roof coatings are easy to install. Smaller roofs in good, serviceable condition can be a weekend do-it-yourself (DIY) project. Larger roofs with leaks and ponding water issues should be coated by a qualified professional. Additional roof coating products, such as foam or coatings designed for seams, may be required underneath the main coating layers. Supplement coating products are used to reinforce damaged or leak-prone problem areas.

=== Tools and equipment ===
High pressure airless spray equipment, pressure washers with a rotary (turbo) nozzle, roof repair equipment and basic painting tools such as brushes, rollers, putty knives, and scaffolding.
