= Density cup =

Quality control instrument

A density cup is an instrument that is used to ensure quality control in a paint or lacquer. It does this by measuring the density of the paint or lacquer, and comparing this density with the density of a standard for that paint or lacquer. If the density reading is different from the standard, then there is an error in paint composition because if there were no error in paint composition, then the measurement would match up to the standard density for that paint or lacquer.

Knowing the density of a paint is essential because a consistent density assures overall consistency between products of the same color.

Density cups are precisely measured cylinders that are made of stainless steel, and usually have a hole in the top through which excess liquid and air bubbles can escape.
