= Chad Valley (musician) =

English electronic recording artist and singer

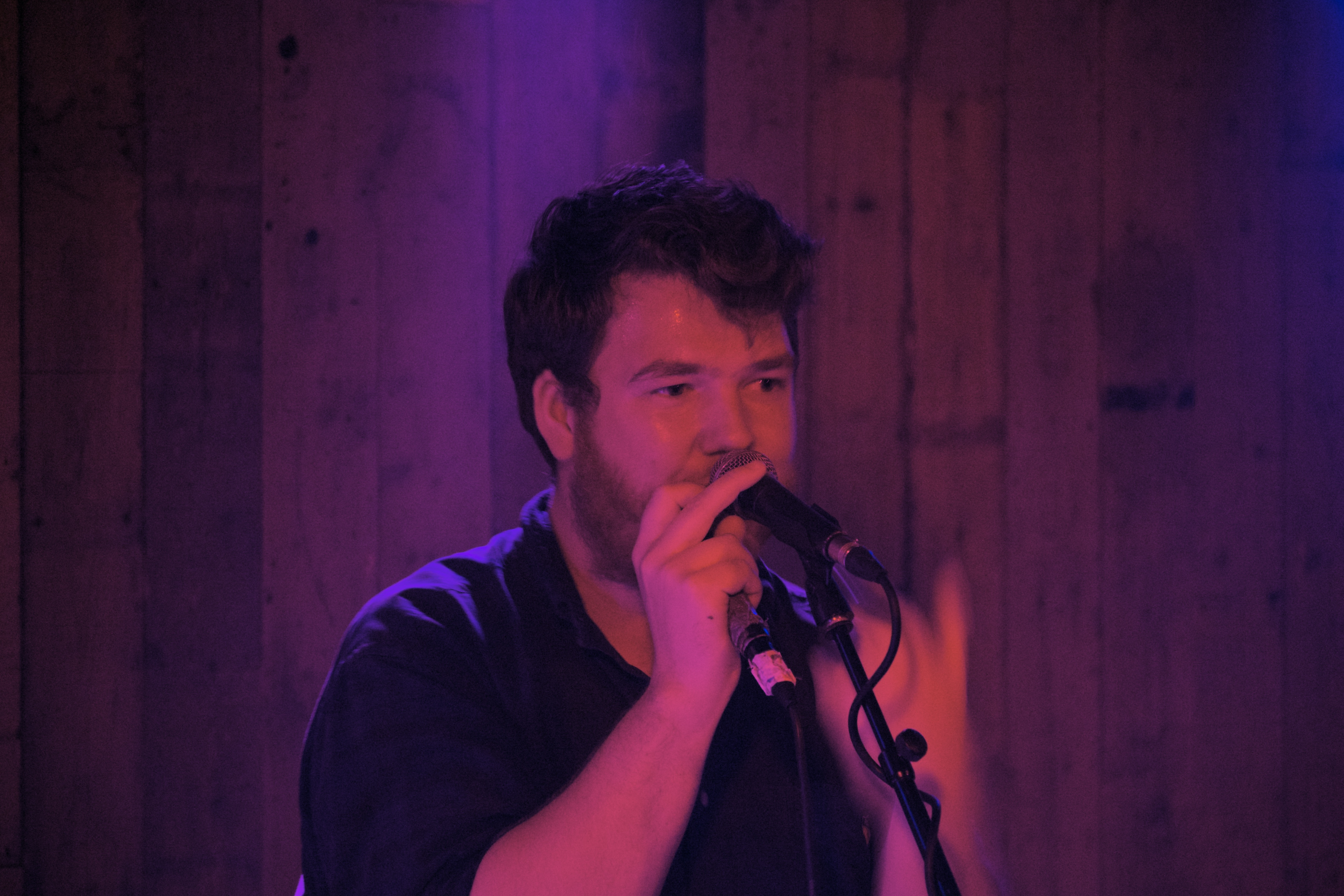
- Chad Valley performing at The Waiting Room in The Three Crowns in Stoke Newington, London on 14 November 2014.

Background information
- Born: Hugo Manuel
- Origin: Oxford, England
- Genres: Chillwave, synthpop
- Years active: 2010–present
- Labels: Cascine
- Member of: Jonquil

Hugo Manuel, better known by his stage name Chad Valley, is an English electronic recording artist and singer. He has released two EPs, various singles and three full-length albums, Young Hunger, Entirely New Blue and Imaginary Music in 2018.

== Career ==
Manuel began Chad Valley as a solo project alongside the Oxford-based band Jonquil which he heads. In 2010, he released his eponymous debut EP via Cascine, which consisted of four tracks. His second EP, Equatorial Ultravox, was released in 2011 leading to wider recognition for Manuel. Neil Ashman of Drowned in Sound described this release as "wistful in tone, but it's no nostalgia trip and summer or not it's a consistently blissful and thrilling EP that bodes well for any forthcoming album."

In 2012, Manuel released his first full-length album, Young Hunger, his longest release as Chad Valley and which involved contributions from many other artists including Twin Shadow, El Perro del Mar and Totally Enormous Extinct Dinosaurs. Under the Radar described the album as "[making] little attempt to veil his affection for the zillion-dollar, slickly produced, mammoth-sized pop albums of the 1980s; the results are as charming and imaginative as one may have come to expect from one of the blogosphere’s most buzzed-about artists." On the album's extensive use of collaboration with other artists, Manuel stated "It was always the intention to have loads of guests from the very beginning. As a way to involve more people than anything else; because I think it's hard, as a solo musician, to not get really introspective. I'd done two EPs worth of introspection; songs that were just me and my thoughts, written and produced by me with lyrics by me. It was all a little too me-centric, and I'm not too comfortable with that. So, I wanted to have other voices in there to widen the palette." Pitchfork stated "The many guests on Young Hunger prevent the album from getting too bogged down in schmaltz, adding color and texture to the record."

== Personal life ==
Manuel's mother Annie Sloan is a British artist, designer, colour expert, author and inventor. Through his mother, Manuel is of Scottish and Fijian descent.

== Discography ==
=== Studio albums ===
- Young Hunger (2012)
- Entirely New Blue (2015)
- Imaginary Music (2018)
- The Starlight Night (as Hugo Manuel) (2020)

=== EPs ===
- Chad Valley (2010)
- Equatorial Ultravox (2011)

=== Singles ===
- Now That I'm Real (How Does It Feel?) (2011)
- Shell Suite & Remixes (2011)
- Fall 4 U (2012)
- Tell All Your Friends (2012)
- Up & Down (Vince Clarke Remix) (2013)
- I Owe You This (2013)
- True (2015)
