= Volume solid =

Volume of dry paint

Volume solid is the volume of paint after it has dried.

== Paint ==
This is different than the weight solid. Paint may contain solvent, resin, pigments, and additives. Many paints do not contain any solvent. After applying the paint, the solid portion will be left on the substrate. Volume solid is the term that indicates the solid proportion of the paint on a volume basis. For example, if the paint is applied in a wet film at a 100 μm thickness and the volume solid of paint is 50%, then the dry film thickness (DFT) will be 50 μm as 50% of the wet paint has evaporated. Suppose the volume solid is 100%, and the wet film thickness is also 100 μm. Then after complete drying of the paint, the DFT will be 100 μm because no solvent will be evaporated.

This is an important concept when using paint industrially to calculate the cost of painting. It can be said that it is the real volume of paint.

Here is the formula by which one can calculate the volume solid of paint,

(Total sum by volume of each solid ingredient in paint x 100%)/ Total sum by volume of each ingredient in paint.

A simple method that anyone can do to determine volume solids empirically is to apply paint to a steel surface with an application knife and measure the wet film thickness. Then cure the paint and measure the dry film thickness. The percentage of dry to wet represents the percentage of volume solids.

In earlier days, the volume solid was measured by a disc method but now a sophisticated instrument is also available which takes only a drop of paint to check the volume solid.

Understanding volume solids allows knowing the true cost of different coatings and how much paint is used to perform its function. Generally, more expensive paints have a higher volume of solids and provide better coverage.
