= Primer (paint) =

Preparatory coating put on materials before painting

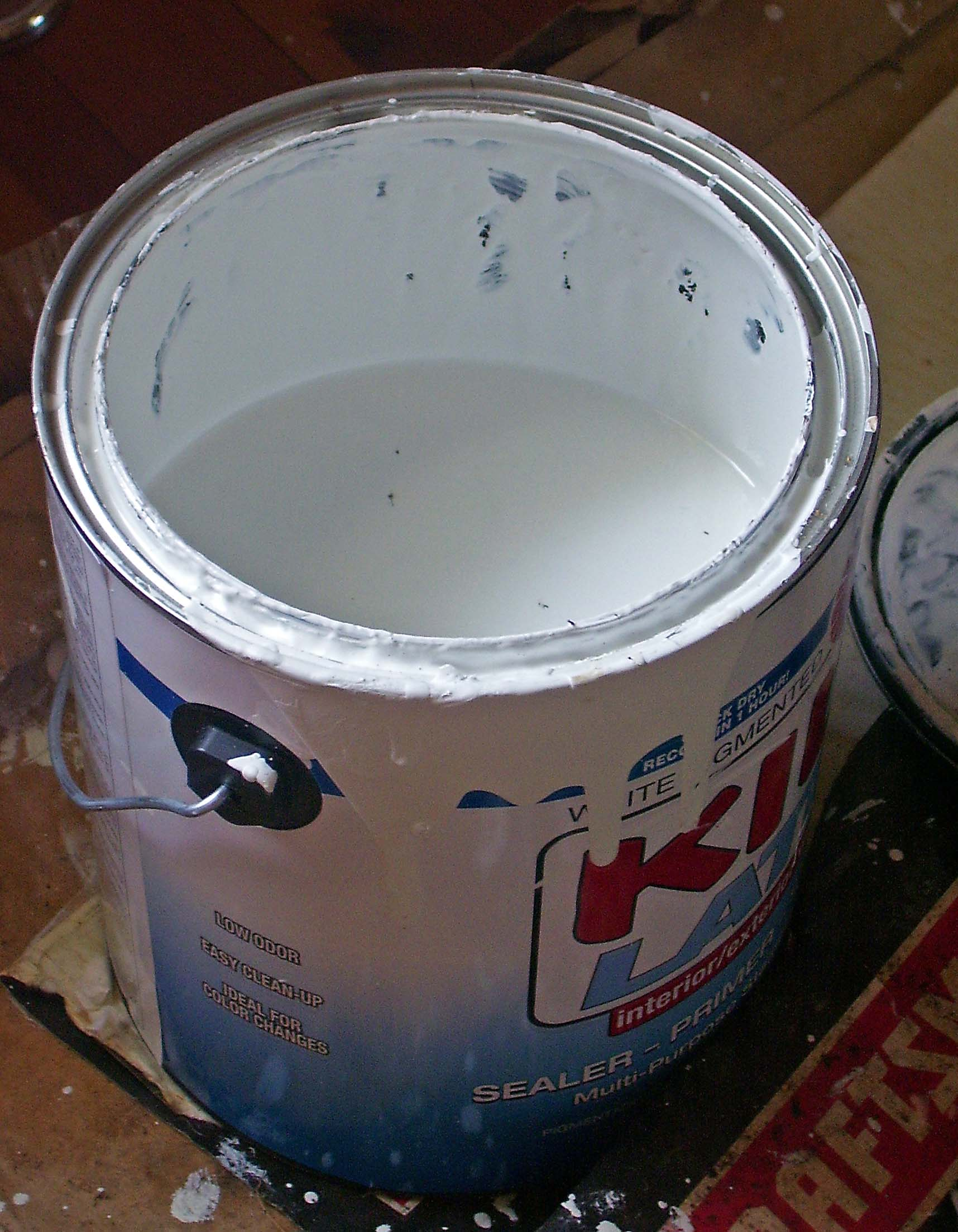
A water-based primer, used primarily on wood

A primer (/ˈpraɪmər/) or undercoat is a preparatory coating put on materials before painting. Priming ensures better adhesion of paint to the surface, increases paint durability, and provides additional protection for the material being painted.

== Composition ==
A primer consists of synthetic resin, solvent and additive agent while some primers contain polyethylene (plastic), for better durability.

== Use ==
Primer is a paint product that allows finishing paint to adhere much better than if it were used alone. It is designed to adhere to surfaces and to form a binding layer that is better prepared to receive the paint. Compared to paint, a primer is not intended to be used as the outermost durable finish and can instead be engineered to have improved filling and binding properties with the material underneath. Sometimes this is achieved by chemistry, as in the case of aluminum primer, but more often this is achieved through controlling the primer's physical properties such as its porosity, tackiness, and hygroscopy.

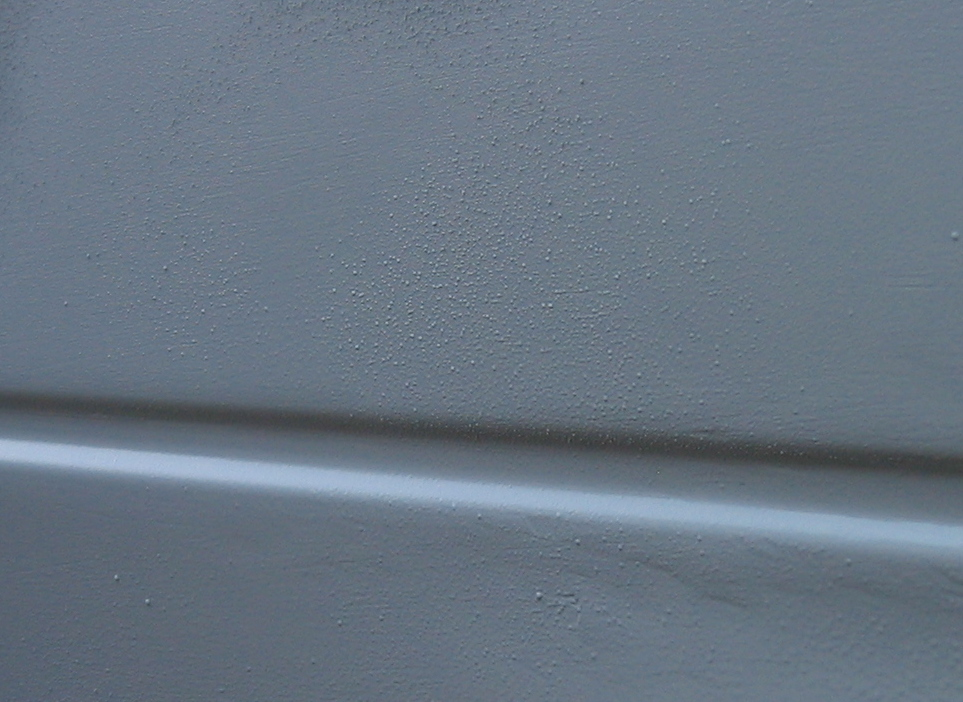
Primer as a step in the coating process of a car body.

In practice, primer is often used when painting porous materials, including concrete and wood. Using a primer is considered mandatory if the material is not water resistant and will be exposed to the elements. Priming gypsum board (drywall) is also standard practice with new construction because it seals the wall from moisture and can prevent the growth of mold. Primers can also be used on dirty surfaces which cannot be cleaned or before painting light colors over a dark finish.

Some primers can be tinted to match more closely with the color of the finishing paint. If the finishing paint is a deep color, tinting the primer can reduce the number of layers of finishing paint that are necessary for good uniformity across the painted surface. Primers are also used to hide joints and seams to give a finished look.

Other primers require that the topcoat be applied within a certain amount of time after the primer dries to ensure optimal adhesion. This varies from 24 hours to up to two weeks after the primer has dried. Painting after the suggested time-frame may cause performance issues depending on the specific situation. It is common to apply the finishing coat of paint before the primer fully cures in order to improve adhesion between the primer and the topcoat. The level of exposure, such as indoors versus outdoors, may affect how important applying the topcoat within the time-frame will be.

=== On wood ===
Wood is very porous and will absorb the solvent in paint and cause it to dry more quickly. This is undesirable because most paints undergo chemical reactions during the process of curing (for example, latex- and alkyd-based paints polymerise when curing) which is dependent on the water or solvent evaporating slowly. A layer of primer will prevent the underlying wood from prematurely absorbing the solvents in the finishing paint.

Primer reduces the number of paint coats needed for good coverage and even color.

A thin layer of paint may still be permeable to water. Water can permeate into the wood and cause warping, mildew, or dry rot. Primer improves the waterproofing of the finish. Primers are not used as part of a wood stain treatment because they obscure the wood grain. Primer differs from wood sealers in that sealers typically don't obscure the wood grain completely.

Primers are often comparable in price to finish paints and the price is influenced by the quality of the ingredients. Primers for some specialty applications can be expensive.

=== On metal ===
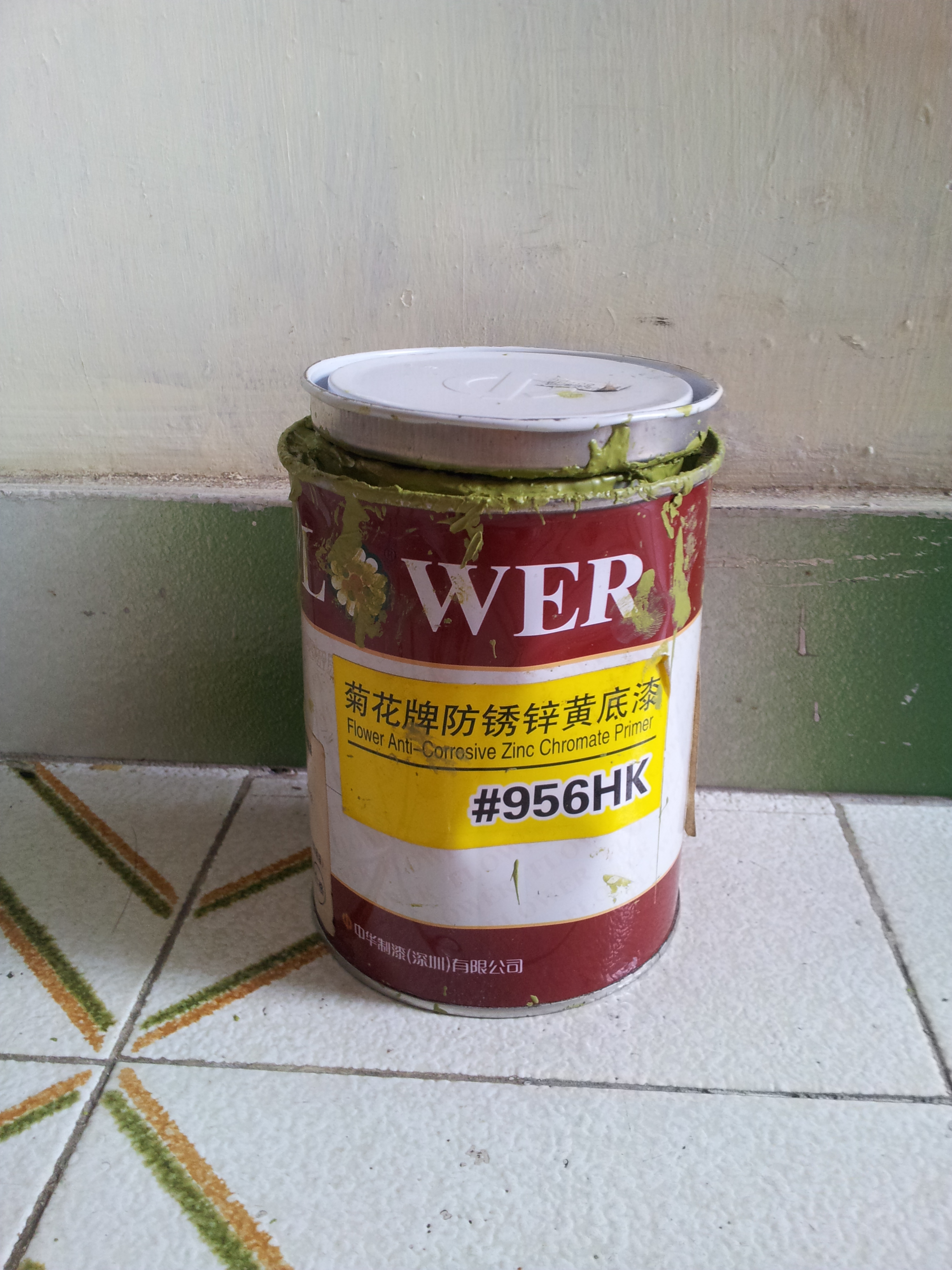
Zinc chromate primer

Some metals, such as untreated aluminum, require a primer; others may not. A primer designed for metal is still highly recommended if a part is to be exposed to moisture. Once water seeps through to the bare metal, oxidation will begin (plain steel will simply rust). Metal primers might contain additional materials to protect against corrosion, such as sacrificial zinc.

Primers are used on metal hydroxides/oxides to improve the surface condition and to encourage bonding. Without a primer, paint applied to metals is prone to peeling.

Special kinds of primer (rust-converters) can be used to chemically convert rust to the solid metal salts. This process is not recommended for structural steel.

Painting and gluing aluminum are important in the aircraft industry, which uses toxic zinc chromate primers and chromating to add the necessary adhesion properties. In addition, primer provides a smooth surface for the paint to adhere to, resulting in a professional-looking finish.

=== On plastic ===
Using a primer on surfaces made of plastic is only necessary when making a drastic change of color (going from dark brown to white, for example) or when a long-lasting coat of paint is desired. This is because most household plastics are not very porous and are not easily damaged by moisture. A primer will reduce the number of layers of paint necessary to completely cover the previous color, and will help the paint make a thorough bond with the surface being painted. Most paints and primers designed for painting plastics are not water-based.

An important point for choosing a primer for plastic is making sure the primer's propellant or solvent will not dissolve or warp the plastic part itself (e.g. most common household spray paint will damage polystyrene foam). For this reason, most manufacturers recommend that both the primer and paint be tested on a less visible location of the part being painted.

=== Alternatives ===
Alternative surface treatments, such as plasma activation, can replace primers in cases when the latter are used to improve adhesive bonding between the substrate and the paint or the lacquer. Quality of the adhesive bonding, such as varnishing and painting, depends strongly on the ability of the adhesive to efficiently cover (wet) the substrate area. This happens when the surface energy of the substrate is greater than the surface energy of the adhesive. However, high-strength adhesives – lacquers and paints – have high surface energy. Thus, their application is problematic for low surface energy materials such as polymers or oxidized metals.

To solve this problem, plasma activation is used as a preparation step before adhesive bonding. It cleans the polymer surface from the organic contaminants, removes a weak boundary layer, strengthens the surface by cross-linking polymer molecules, and chemically bonds to the substrate a strong layer with high surface energy and chemical affinity to the adhesive. Moreover, plasma processing can also reduce or remove hard oxides from metal surfaces, enabling painting and gluing of metals such as copper and aluminum. Importantly, plasma activation can be performed at atmospheric pressure in air with fast processing speeds. It does not use wet chemistry, which positively affects its costs, safety and environmental impact.

== See also ==
- Paint
- Aerosol paint
- Gesso
- Stain-blocking primer
