= Annie Sloan =

British artist, colour expert and author (born 1949)

Elizabeth Ann Sloan CBE (born 19 June 1949) is a British artist, designer, colour expert, author and inventor. She is the inventor of Chalk Paint, and the CEO of her family-run company, Annie Sloan Interiors.

Sloan's stated objective is to assist people in their creative work. This is conducted through a network of independent stockists and through teaching.

Sloan studied Fine Art at Reading university, where she was a member of the avant-garde punk band Moodies, Sloan went on to write several books on traditional paints and decorative painting techniques, starting with The Complete Book of Decorative Paint Techniques in 1988. She developed her own line of decorative paint, Chalk Paint, in 1990. She is now considered an international authority on paint and colour and was appointed Commander of the Order of the British Empire (CBE) in the 2023 Birthday Honours for services to interior design.

== Early life, education and family ==
Sloan was born in Sydney, Australia, in 1949 to a Scottish father and a Fijian mother. It was Sloan's journalist father who inspired her love of the arts by introducing her to the work of the Fauve painter Gauguin.The family settled in England in 1959.

Sloan studied fine art at Croydon College of Art under Marc Camille Chaimowicz and at Reading University (MFA 1973) under tutors including Terry Frost and Claude Rogers.

It was during her time at Reading that she discovered Charleston Farmhouse and wrote to the artist Duncan Grant expressing her wish to visit. In 2018, Sloan began working with the Charleston Trust, which she described as “a dream come true”.

As a student, Sloan explored her punk and performance art ideals alongside fellow artists and students including Anne Bean in the band known as The Moodies. Malcolm McLaren was interested in signing The Moodies, having seen their performance supporting Pink Floyd, but the band was unwilling to compromise their artistic integrity.

Sloan lives and works in Oxford, England, with her husband, David. They have three sons, including the musicians Chad Valley, and Djrum and five grandchildren. She is a cousin of the BBC TV executive the late Tom Sloan.

== Career ==
After graduating from university, Sloan worked as an art teacher at various schools in East London from 1973-1977. She also worked for Time Out magazine as their Theatre and Events Critic (1973- 1975). It was after this that Sloan turned her attention to decorative painting.[5] [7]

Sloan started a mural painting business and carried out many commissions in London and beyond. Many of her commissions were for children’s rooms and this led to her co-founding in 1981, an interiors shop for children, “Hippo Hall” in Pimlico Road. Sloan designed a range of fabrics themed for children, including bed linen, and she continued to undertake mural painting. During this period until 1985 she also taught decorative painting techniques at the Inchbald School of Design.

Sloan's first book, The Complete Book of Decorative Paint Techniques, was co-authored with Kate Gwynn and published in 1988. It was translated and made available worldwide. It was quickly followed by other books. The success of her books propelled her career as a decorative paint expert and led to requests to teach decorative painting techniques internationally.

== Chalk Paint ==
Dissatisfaction with existing decorative paints led Sloan to develop her own decorative paint in 1990. Drawing on a lifetime of research and experience in working with paint and colour, the invention of Chalk Paint was borne from Sloan's need for a paint which could be used to achieve endless decorative effects – and quickly – without the need to sand or otherwise prepare surfaces before application. Initially, the paint was manufactured in Belgium. In 2014 Sloan set up her own manufacturing facility in Oxford UK. All Annie Sloan Chalk Paint is manufactured there and exported worldwide.

She opened a shop in Headington, Oxford, in 2000, where she sold her paint, as well as fabrics and ready-painted furniture.

Her book Colour Recipes for Painted Furniture and More was published in 2013. This was followed by Room Recipes for Style and Colour in 2014.

In 2018 Sloan launched her bookazine, The Colourist, which was published twice annually, and now continues as a monthly Podcast.

In 2021 Sloan launched Annie Sloan Wall Paint alongside Annie Sloan Satin Paint.

== Collaborations ==
Sloan has collaborated with Oxfam, Charleston Trust, ActionAid, Create Academy, The RHS, and The Bodleian Library on fundraising and creative projects.

Sloan was appointed Commander of the Order of the British Empire (CBE) in the 2023 Birthday Honours for services to interior design.

== Bibliography ==
- The Complete Book of Decorative Paint Techniques: An Inspirational Sourcebook of Paint Finishes and Interior Decoration, with Kate Gwynn. Ebury Press (ISBN 0712619054, 1988)
- Nursery Style: Creating Beautiful Rooms for Children, with Felicity Bryan. Contemporary Books (ISBN 0809242826, 1989)
- Simple Painted Furniture, DK (ISBN 0863183506, 1989)
- Colour in Decoration with Kate Gwynn, Frances Lincoln Publishers (ISBN 071120604X, 1990)
- Traditional Paints and Finishes with Kate Gwynn, Collins & Brown (ISBN 1855851695, 1993)
- The Practical Guide to Decorative Antique Effects, Reader's Digest (ISBN 0895777940, 1995)
- Decorative Paint Effects: A Practical Guide, Reader's Digest (ISBN 0802114288, 1996)
- Decorative Gilding: A Practical Guide, Reader's Digest (ISBN 0895778793, 1996)
- Decorative Stenciling and Stamping: A Practical Guide, Reader's Digest (ISBN 0895779277, 1997)
- Decorative Wood Finishes: A Practical Guide, Reader's Digest (ISBN 0895779285, 1997)
- Decorative Decoupage: A Practical Guide, Reader's Digest (ISBN 0762100117, 1998)
- The Painted Furniture Sourcebook: Motifs from the Medieval Times to the Present Day, Collins & Brown, (ISBN 1855854686, 1999)
- Modern Paint Effects: A Guide to Contemporary Paint Finishes from Inspiration to Technique, Collins & Brown, (ISBN 1855856719, 2000)
- Paint Alchemy: Recipes for Making and Adapting Your Own Paint for Home Decorating, Collins & Brown, (ISBN 185585886X, 2001)
- How to Paint Furniture, Collins & Brown, (ISBN 1855858819, 2001)
- Colour Schemes That Really Work, Collins & Brown (ISBN 1855858061, 2002)
- Painted Garden: 25 Easy Outdoor Paint Effects to Transform Any Surface, Laurel Glen Publishing (ISBN 1571459278, 2003)
- Painted Kitchen: Paint Effect Transformations for Walls, Cupboards, and Furniture, Laurel Glen Publishing (ISBN 1592231845, 2004)
- Complete Book of Decorative Paint Finishes, Collins & Brown, (ISBN 1843400529, 2004)
- Quick and Easy Paint Transformations: 50 step-by-step ways to makeover your home for next to nothing, CICO Books (ISBN 1906525757, 2010)
- Creating the French Look: Inspirational Ideas and 25 Step-By-Step Projects, CICO Books (ISBN 1907563954, 2011)
- The Annie Sloan Work Book: For Your Colour & Paint Ideas & Inspiration, Oxford Folio (ISBN 0956740545, 2012)
- Color Recipes for Painted Furniture and More: 40 step-by-step projects to transform your home, CICO Books (ISBN 1908862777, 2013)
- Room Recipes for Style and Color, CICO Books (ISBN 1782491546, 2014)
- Chalk Paint Workbook: A practical guide to mixing paint and making style choices, CICO Books (ISBN 1782493034, 2015)
- Paints Everything: Step-by-step projects for your entire home, from walls, floors, and furniture, to curtains, blinds, pillows, and shades, CICO Books (ISBN 1782493565, 2016)
- The Colourist (2018-) ,
