= Chalk paint =

Water-based paint made with chalk

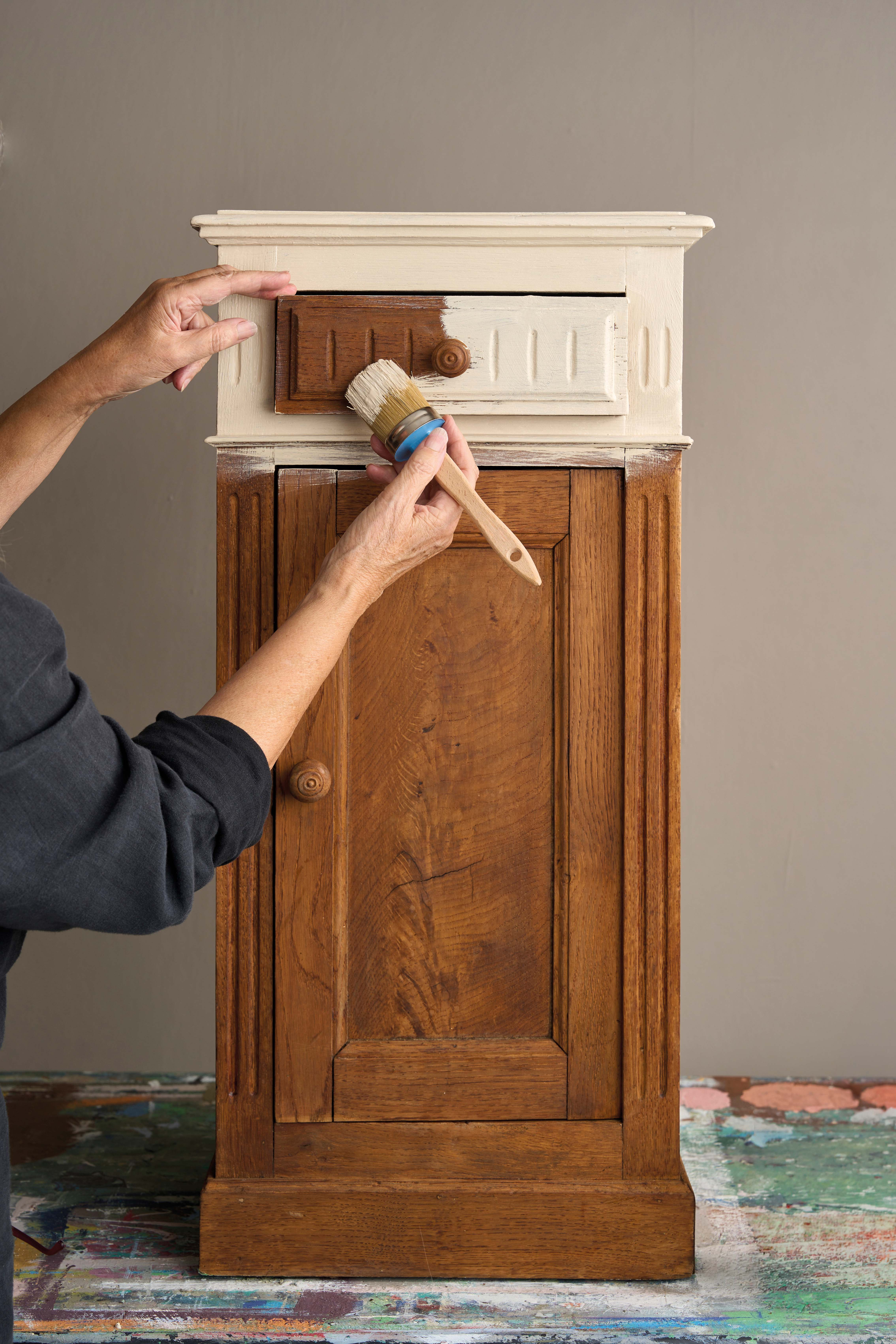
A wooden side table being painted with chalk paint

Chalk paint is a decorative, water-based furniture paint characterised by its ultra-matte, chalky finish and ability to adhere to a wide variety of surfaces with minimal preparation. The product was invented by decorative artist Annie Sloan in 1990, who introduced it under the registered trademark Chalk Paint. Since its introduction, the term "chalk paint" has increasingly been used generically to describe similar decorative paints produced by other manufacturers.

== Origins ==
Annie Sloan developed Chalk Paint in 1990 while working as a decorative artist and author. Dissatisfied with the furniture paints available at the time, she sought to create a paint that required little or no sanding or priming and could produce a matte, textured finish suitable for decorative techniques and painted furniture. She formulated the product herself and introduced it commercially under the registered trademark Chalk Paint. By the early twenty-first century, Chalk Paint was available through a network of independent retailers in numerous countries and was a recognised category within decorative paint.

Chalk Paint is a registered trademark owned by Annie Sloan Interiors Ltd. Since the product's invention, "chalk paint" has also become widely used as a generic description for similar decorative paints produced by other manufacturers.

== Uses and application ==
Chalk paint can be used in a variety of ways and on multiple surfaces including: furniture restoration, kitchen cabinets, decorative finishes, home décor, painted floors, decorative wall treatments, paint mixing, colour washing, distressing techniques, upcycling vintage furniture

Chalk paint can be applied with a brush, roller, or spray gun. The paint should be applied to a clean surface in thin layers and will typically dry within two hours. A topcoat sealer, such as wax or lacquer, can be applied to protect the chalk paint. The topcoats may enhance the decorative characteristics and can be used to create effects.

Chalk paint can be used to create a range of decorative effects on furniture. Depending on the application technique and subsequent finishing, painted surfaces can be given a distressed or aged appearance, layered colour effects, textured finishes, or a smoother contemporary finish.

== Types ==
Commercial chalk paints are water-based decorative coatings. The name "chalk paint" refers to the distinctive soft, ultra-matte, chalky appearance of the dried finish rather than the presence of chalk as a defining ingredient. Although formulations vary between manufacturers, commercial chalk paints typically achieve their characteristic finish through a combination of mineral fillers, pigments and polymer binders including calcium carbonate together with acrylic. The term has since become widely used to describe decorative paints that produce a similar matte finish, regardless of their specific formulation.

Chalk paint is often sold in tins or spray cans depending on the desired application. Conventional chalk paint, which requires application to a surface with a brush or roller, is often sold in a tin, whereas chalk spray paint allows you to quickly apply it by spraying and is sold in a spray can.

== Global retail network ==
Since its introduction, chalk paint has become closely associated with the growth of the furniture upcycling and decorative painting movement. In addition to selling the paint, many independent interiors and DIY retailers worldwide offer workshops and demonstrations that teach decorative painting techniques, colour application, distressing, waxing and finishing. These events often bring together hobbyists, furniture restorers and interior design enthusiasts, creating opportunities for skill sharing and community engagement while also supporting local creative communities. This global network has contributed to the international popularity of chalk paint and the wider revival of painted furniture and furniture upcycling.

== Influence on DIY furniture restoration and upcycling ==
The introduction of chalk paint coincided with a growing interest in DIY home improvement, furniture restoration and sustainable interior design. Its ability to adhere to a wide range of surfaces with minimal preparation made decorative furniture painting more accessible to hobbyists and first-time users, reducing the need for extensive sanding or priming. As a result, painted furniture became an increasingly popular alternative to replacing older pieces.

The widespread adoption of chalk paint has been associated with the growth of the furniture upcycling movement, in which existing furniture is repaired, repurposed or redecorated to extend its useful life. Throughout the 1990s and 2000s, painted and distressed finishes became a prominent feature of interior design trends, supported by workshops, online tutorials and social media communities dedicated to furniture painting. The availability of chalk paint products from multiple manufacturers has further contributed to the popularity of DIY furniture restoration as both a creative hobby and a small business activity.

Chalk paint has also influenced a generation of professional furniture artists and educators, many of whom teach decorative painting techniques through independent studios, workshops and online platforms.

== Sustainability ==
The use of chalk paint has been associated with the wider movement towards furniture upcycling and the reuse of existing household items. By enabling furniture to be refurbished rather than discarded, painted finishes can extend the lifespan of wooden and other durable furnishings, reducing the demand for new materials and helping to divert usable items from landfill. This practice has been cited as an example of product reuse within the circular economy.
