= Ziplocal =

American phone directory company

- Company type: Private
- Industry: Organic search; Local search
- Founded: 2007, 2010
- Headquarters: Pleasant Grove, Utah, U.S.
- Number of locations: 1
- Area served: United States
- Services: Digital Marketing, Website Development, Social Media Marketing, Reviews Management, Search Engine Optimization, Content Creation
- Website: www.ziplocal.com

Ziplocal is a digital marketing company that provides local search information across the United States. Ziplocal previously printed yellow pages. Ziplocal provides digital services for small to medium-sized business, such as websites, local and organic SEO tools, social media marketing, and reputation management.

Ziplocal was previously known as the Phone Directories Company.

== History ==
Phone Directories Company was founded in 1971 by Marc Bingham as a Yellow Pages provider. In January 2010, the Utah-based Phone Directories Company (PDC) entered into an agreement with Canpages and rebranded itself as Ziplocal. In March 2010, then-CEO of Canpages Olivier Vincent organized the sale of Canpages (including Ziplocal's assets) to Yellow Pages Group (YPG). YPG then traded its US division (YPG Directories, LLC.) to Ziplocal, LP in exchange for an equity-to-equity swap. YPG now owns 35% of Ziplocal. Vincent then left his position as CEO of Canpages and became CEO and President of the Board of Directors of Ziplocal.

Vincent was the CEO of Ziplocal until 2011, becoming the CEO of consulting firm Hipparcos Technology. Following Vincent, Mike Anderson, former SVP at Canpages, became CEO until 2012.

In 2013 Ziplocal was sold to Kevin Shea. Mr. Shea served as the chairman and CEO of Ziplocal from 2013 to 2022. Stephanie Colfack was promoted to president and CEO in 2022 and currently operates the company.

ZipLocal began offering digital marketing services in 2010 with Local SEO as well as Website development. In Fall of 2024 Ziplocal has fully transitioned from a phonebook and digital marketing agency to a digital-only marketing agency.

== See also ==
- Comparison of web search engines
- List of search engines
- Timeline of web search engines
