= Stain-blocking primer =

Stain-blocking primers are used to cover stains such as watermarks, nicotine (actually tar), markers, smoke, and prevent them bleeding through newly applied layers of paint. They also provide adhesion over problematic surfaces, giving better film leveling, and durability. Commonly used stain-blocking paints include acrylic and alkyd.

== Volatile organic compounds ==
Low volatile organic compounds (VOCs) formulations partially or completely eliminate odor, making them safer for the environment.

However, in the United States, solvent-based products with high VOC levels still represent approximately 25% of the total market volume for interior stain-blocking primers. They continue to maintain this significant market share even though many national, regional or local legislations and initiatives concerning the reduction of VOCs have been recently established.

Since their introduction to the US market in 1997, low VOC, odorless stain-blocking primers have become known for their unique combination of highly effective stain blocking technologies. These properties are traditionally associated with solvent-based products. They also display comfortable application and low odor – characteristics commonly associated with water-based products. A good primer has to be compatible with a wide variety of substrates that may be encountered in an interior situation such as: drywall, cement, concrete, plaster and spackling, wood, paneling, old paint, metals, fiberboard, etc. Very frequently, particularly in renovation work, the surfaces encountered will be covered with a variety of stains such as water-soluble types from water leaks, smoke, nicotine, inks, etc., as well as solvent soluble stains such as tar, tannin, and others.

Recently, many states decreased the VOC limit from 450 g/L to 350 g/L limit for the specialty primers, sealers and undercoats category. As state regulatory agencies continue to introduce stricter legislation concerning VOCs, this will pose an even tougher challenge to manufacturers of solvent-based stain-blocking primers. In order to decrease the VOC of a coating, it is necessary to remove solvent from the formulation. This has the effect of increasing relative solids content (both pigment + binder) in the formulation, which has a negative effect on viscosity. Increasing resin content primarily increases high-shear viscosity and that is important for sprayability. Increasing pigment content primarily affects low and medium shear viscosities, which are important for flow, leveling, and sag resistance. When formulating a low odor, low VOC primer, if the plan is to increase the binder, then resins with lower viscosity profiles and solubility in low-odor, isoparaffinic solvents are needed.

Low-odor, isoparaffinic solvent, in addition to being lower in odor than solvents typically used in solvent-based systems, also has a higher margin of safety versus stronger solvents. The following discussion on Air Change Index (ACI) illustrates that less air turnover is needed when using low-odor, isoparaffinic solvent in comparison to other solvent-based systems such as alkyds.

=== Air Change Index (ACI) ===
The indoor use of solvent-based primer results in increased solvent exposure due to build-up of fumes in the air. One way to reduce the amount of solvent in the air is to use fans to renew the air. The Air Change Index (ACI) of a solvent is an indication of the margin of safety of a solvent. The lower the ACI, the less air turnover needed.

The ACI is calculated based on the amount of solvent in the primer, the volume of the room to be primed, the volatility of the solvent and the amount of primer to be applied. The calculations were made based on a 3,500 square feet (330 m^{2}) room and primer with coverage of 375 ft2/gallon. The below calculated ACIs were done on solvent-based primer containing 350 g/L of solvents and the water-based primer containing 50 g/L of butyl glycol.

The values on this chart indicate that the use of mineral spirits based primers would need 6 to 7 air changes per hour requiring significant ventilation. The use of low-odor, isoparaffinic solvent-based primers would only need 1 to 2 air changes per hour. Finally, the use of water-based primers would need less than 1 air change per hour. Another way to interpret this information is that the margin of safety is 3 to 4 times higher with low-odor, isoparaffinic solvent than with mineral spirits, and 5 to 6 times higher than with toluene. However, proper ventilation is still good practice with any type of primer.

Stain-blocking primers with low-odor, isoparaffinic solvent are considered to have less of a negative impact on the health of paint contractors and building residents. Despite the lower levels of VOCs, application, coverage and overall performance are comparable to their high VOC counterparts.
