= Calcium plumbate =

Identifiers
CAS Number	Ca_{2}PbO_{4}: 12013-69-3; CaO_{3}Pb: 12774-29-7
3D model (JSmol)	Ca_{2}PbO_{4}: Interactive image; CaO_{3}Pb: Interactive image
ChemSpider	CaO_{3}Pb: 32816358
ECHA InfoCard	100.031.434
EC Number	Ca_{2}PbO_{4}: 234-591-3
PubChem CID	CaO_{3}Pb: 14228656
- InChI: Ca_{2}PbO_{4}: InChI=1S/Ca.3O.Pb/q+2;;2*-1; Key: BKCKYDWIGITWSZ-UHFFFAOYSA-N
- SMILES: Ca_{2}PbO_{4}: [O-][Pb]([O-])([O-])[O-].[Ca+2].[Ca+2]; CaO_{3}Pb: [O-][Pb](=O)[O-].[Ca+2]

Properties
Chemical formula	CaO_{3}Pb

Hazards
- GHS labelling
Pictograms	(GHS08: Health hazard)
Signal word	Warning
Hazard statements	H341, H351, H360Df, H373
Precautionary statements	P203, P260, P280, P318, P319, P405, P501
- Except where otherwise noted, data are given for materials in their standard state (at 25 °C [77 °F], 100 kPa). Infobox references

Calcium plumbate is an inorganic chemical that has been used extensively as an anticorrosive pigment in paints and coatings. The formula is given as CaO_{3}Pb, but also is shown as CaO_{4}Pb_{2} in other sources. The compound has REACH restricted status due to the general toxicity of lead based compounds.

== Manufacture ==
It is usually manufactured by the reaction of calcium oxide (CaO) and lead oxide (PbO) at high temperature in the presence of excess oxygen.

Recent research indicates that it can be prepared by sol-gel methodology.

== Toxicology ==
Calcium plumbate and other lead paint additives have been known to cause lead poisoning for over 50 years. The effects of paint containing calcium plumbate dust have likewise been studied and analytical techniques developed to assess lead content. Studies also include finding calcium plumbate in soils and further possible bioaccumulation. The demand for lead in all forms is decreasing worldwide, though the use of calcium plumbate and other heavy metal compounds in cement and concrete is subject to recent research and the specific toxicology studied.

== See also ==
- Environmental issues with paint
- Lead abatement
- Lead-based paint in the United Kingdom
