= Lead-based paint in the United States =

History of a type of paint

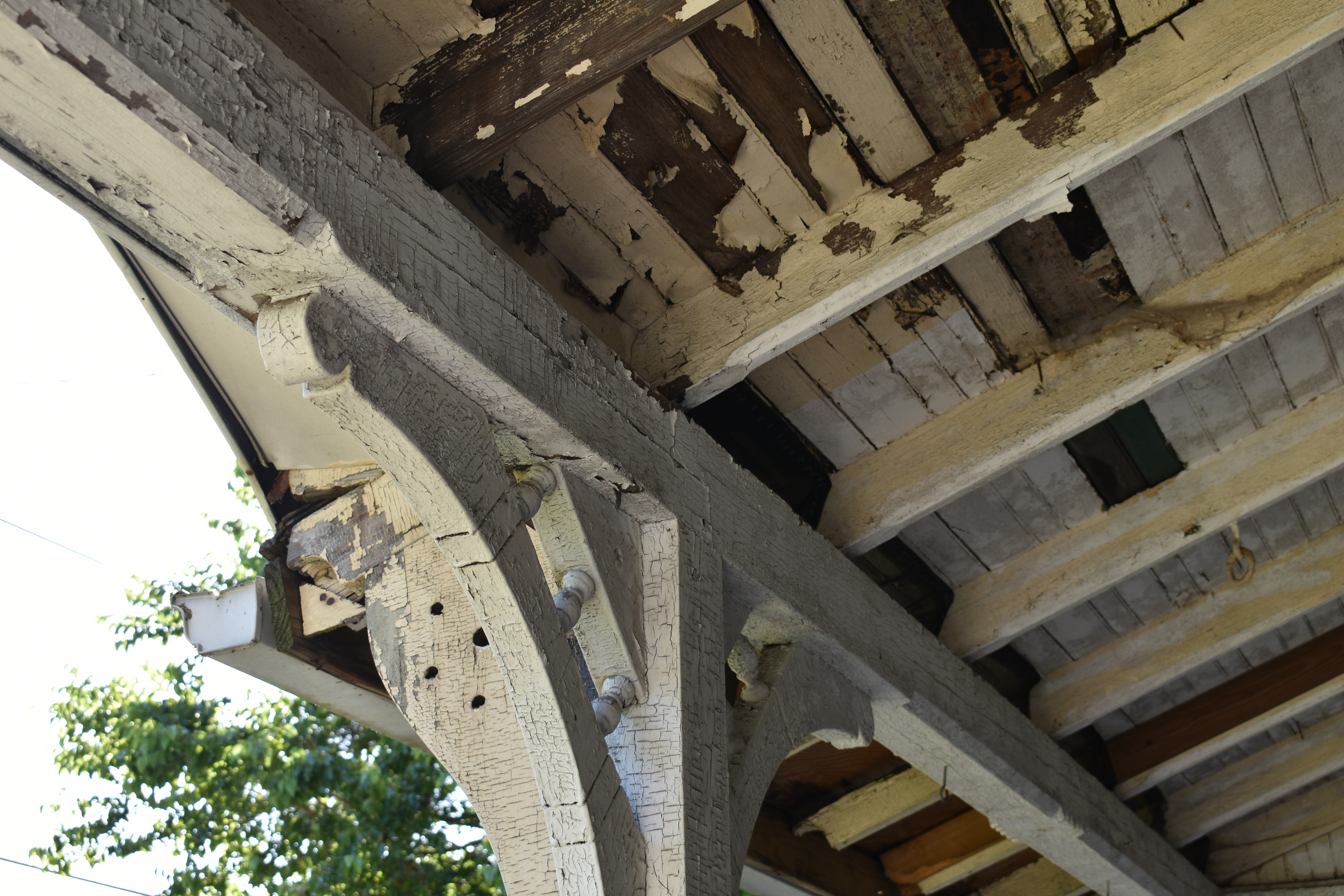
Lead paint on a porch in 2018

Lead-based paint was widely used in the United States because of its durability. The United States banned the manufacture of lead-based house paint in 1978 due to health concerns.

Lead has long been considered to be a harmful environmental pollutant. Cited cases of lead poisoning date back to the early 20th century. In the July 1904 edition of its monthly publication, paint manufacturer, Sherwin-Williams, reported the dangers of paint containing lead, noting that a French expert had deemed lead paint "poisonous in a large degree, both for the workmen and for the inhabitants of a house painted with lead colors."

In 1971, Congress banned the use of lead-based paint in residential projects (including residential structures and environments) constructed by, or with the assistance of, the federal government. The Consumer Product Safety Commission followed with implementing regulations, effective in 1978. Additional regulations regarding lead abatement, testing and related issues have been issued by the Environmental Protection Agency (EPA).

Much of the government's response to the lead public health problems in the 1970s can be credited to the work of epidemiologist and pediatrician, Philip J. Landrigan, who conducted detailed studies of lead poisoning near lead refineries, as well as the effects of lead in gasoline.

In 1991, Secretary of the Department of Health and Human Services, Louis Wade Sullivan, called lead the "number one environmental threat to the health of children in the United States." Humans are exposed to lead through air, drinking water, food, contaminated soil, deteriorating paint, and dust. Airborne lead enters the body by breathing or swallowing lead particles or dust once it has settled. Old lead-based paint is the most significant source of lead exposure in the U.S. Most homes built before 1960 contain heavily leaded paint. Some homes built as recently as 1978 may also contain lead paint.

The U.S. Centers for Disease Control and Prevention’s (CDC) National Center for Health Statistics monitors blood lead levels in the United States. Experts use a new level based on the U.S. population of children ages 1-5 years who are in the top 2.5% of children when tested for lead in their blood (when compared to children who are exposed to more lead than most children). Currently that is 3.5 micrograms of lead per deciliter of blood.

== Overview ==
=== Definition ===
The District of Columbia defines "lead-based paint" as any "paint, surface coating that contains lead equal to or exceeding 0.7 milligram per square centimeter (0.7 mg/cm2) or 0.5% by weight." This is more stringent than the HUD lead-based paint standard of 1.0 mg/cm2) . Some states have adopted this or similar definitions of "lead-based paint." These definitions are used to enforce regulations that apply to certain activities conducted in housing constructed prior to 1978, such as abatement, or the permanent elimination of a "lead-based paint hazard."

The U.S. government and many states have regulations regarding lead-based paint. Many of them apply to evaluating a property for lead-based paint. There are two different testing procedures that are similar but yield different information. Lead-based paint inspections will evaluate all painted surfaces in a complex to determine where lead-based paint, if any, is present. The procedures for lead inspections is outlined in the United States Department of Housing and Urban Development (HUD) Guidelines, Chapter 7, 1997 Revision. The other testing is a lead-based paint risk assessment. In this testing, only deteriorated painted surfaces are tested and dust wipe samples are collected. This information will help the risk assessor determine if there are any lead hazards. Many property owners decided to get a combination of both tests to determine where the lead-based paint is present and what hazards are present as well. Risk assessments are outlined in the HUD Guidelines, Chapter 5. In addition, if a child is poisoned in a property, the owner may be required to perform abatement (permanent elimination of the lead hazard).

=== The Lead-Based Paint Disclosure Regulation ===
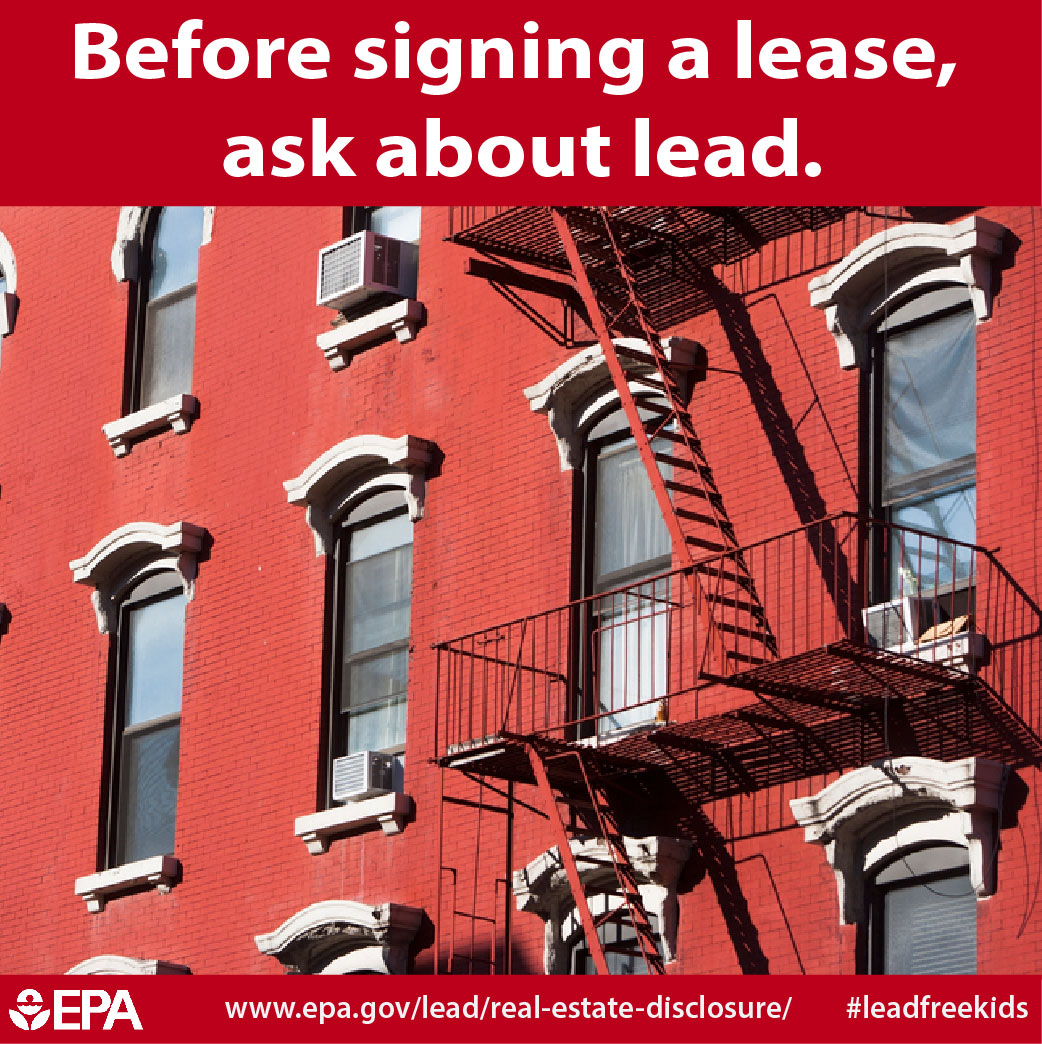
EPA flyer on lead-based paint disclosure

In 1996, the Department of Housing and Urban Development and the Environmental Protection Agency enacted the Lead-Based Paint Disclosure Regulation. It requires owners of pre-1978 "target housing" to disclose to potential buyers or renters all known information about the presence of lead-based paint and/or lead-based paint hazards in the property. It requires that the potential buyer or tenant be given the lead information pamphlet, "Protect Your Family From Lead In Your Home," or other EPA-approved pamphlet as well as a specific disclosure statement. The option of whether to test for the presence of lead-based paint is left to the owner, so long as a decision not to test is disclosed.

=== Renovation, Repair and Painting ===
The EPA issued a new regulation called 'Renovation, Repair and Painting' (RRP) regarding the renovation of residential housing and child-occupied buildings built before 1978 on April 22, 2008. The rule (Federal Register: July 15, 2009 (Volume 74, Number 134)) became effective April 22, 2010. Under the rule, contractors performing renovation, repair and painting projects that disturb lead-based coatings (including lead paint, shellac or varnish) in child-occupied facilities built before 1978 must be certified and must follow specific work practices to prevent lead contamination. EPA’s RRP rule impacts many construction trades, including general contractors and special trade contractors, painters, plumbers, carpenters, glaziers, wood floor refinishers and electricians. Activities performed by all of these trades can disturb lead-based paint and have the potential to create hazardous lead dust. For most individuals, eight hours of training is required. However, individuals who have successfully completed renovation courses developed by HUD or EPA, or an abatement worker or supervisor course accredited by EPA or an authorized State or Tribal program, can become certified renovators by taking a four-hour EPA-accredited renovator refresher training.

The RRP rule is controversial, primarily due to the increased cost remodelers incur as a result of having to set up dust containment apparatuses, including sealing off doorways and HVAC ducts with plastic. Various national trade associations have been very vocal in their opposition, some going so far as to sue the EPA. Though the EPA considered expanding the rule to require contractors to pass a third-party dust wipe clearance exam these revisions were rejected in July, 2011.

Although the rule was not fully implemented until April 2010, certain elements were required before, and others required attention well before April 2010.

- Before April 2009, contractors that disturb paint in homes, residential buildings, schools and child care facilities built prior to 1978 had to provide lead hazard information prior to the start of the job to building owners, occupants, and to the families of children using the facilities by distributing EPA’s new Renovate Right brochure.
- As of April 2009, trainers could begin to apply to EPA or an EPA-approved state for accreditation, and, once approved, contractors and construction trade workers could begin to take the training to become certified.
- Beginning October 2009, firms could apply for EPA or state certification.
- Beginning April 2010, all businesses engaged in renovation, repair or painting activities in homes, residential buildings, schools and child care facilities built prior to 1978 must be certified, use certified workers, and follow specific lead-safe work practices to prevent lead contamination.

== State action against the lead paint industry ==
The state of Rhode Island filed a public nuisance lawsuit in 1999 (State of Rhode Island v. Lead Industries Association) to force the former manufacturers of lead paint to pay for the cleanup of current lead hazards in Rhode Island. After a trial that ended in a hung jury in 2002, the state refiled the case. In February 2006, the jury decided in favor of the state and said that Sherwin-Williams, NL Industries and Millennium Holdings would have to pay for the clean-up of lead paint in the state. On July 1, 2008, the Rhode Island Supreme Court in a landmark decision overturned the verdict, dismissing the case stating that "the State of Rhode Island 'cannot allege' facts sufficient to state a claim for common law public nuisance against lead pigment manufacturers."

In 2007, the Missouri Supreme Court and the New Jersey Supreme Court also rejected the use of the public nuisance theory in lead paint lawsuits, leaving Ohio and California as the only two remaining public nuisance cases.

The California Supreme Court has reviewed the contingency fee agreement between the municipalities and private counsel. A briefing schedule is currently being set. In recent rulings, the Supreme Court held the contingent fee agreement was improper, stating that “When a government attorney has a personal interest in the litigation, the neutrality so essential to the system is violated.”

While the City of Columbus, Ohio voluntarily dropped its lawsuit against the paint industry after the Rhode Island decision, the State of Ohio's suit remains.

== Real estate maintenance and renovation ==
Humans can be poisoned during unsafe renovations or repainting jobs on housing that has lead paint. Therefore, deteriorating (peeling, chipping, cracking, etc.) paint should be stabilized in a lead-safe manner. More than 250,000 children in the United States have significantly harmful levels of lead in their bodies. There is no safe level of exposure.

Dry sanding, dry scraping, removing paint by torching and burning, the use of heat guns over 1100°F, and machine-sanding or grinding without a HEPA filtered dust collection system or a HEPA-filtered vacuum are all prohibited by the United States Department of Housing and Urban Development (HUD) as methods of removing lead-based-paint. HUD prohibits these methods because they have been proven to create significant levels of lead dust during remodeling, renovation and painting. The use of these methods should be avoided because they significantly increase the chance to become lead poisoned. Paint strippers are also often used to remove lead-based-paint from walls. There are specialized paint strippers for use with lead paint which render lead non-hazardous decreasing the risks associated with lead paint removal.

HUD requires a dust test for "clearance" at the end of any remodeling or repainting job be performed by a third-party professional who is independent of the entity performing the work.

Lead evaluations of paint are usually performed by a field testing method known as X-Ray fluorescence (XRF) using equipment which can effectively detect lead. XRF is the preferred method because it is not destructive and a reading is usually obtained in about 4–8 seconds with a 95% accuracy at the 2-sigma level.

Instruments of this sort have an inconclusive range, and when a reading falls in this range (range is different for each instrument and model), a paint chip may be taken and sent for laboratory analysis. Testing for lead in dust, water, and air also require laboratory analysis. Although there are commercially available lead test kits, they are not reliable and are not authorized by HUD for the use of determining if a property is lead-based-paint free.

The home's year of construction can be a clue as to the likelihood that lead is present in its paint. As of April 2011, 87% of homes built before 1940 contain at least some lead paint, homes built between 1940 and 1960 have a 69% chance of containing such paint, homes built between 1960 and 1978 have a 24% chance of containing lead paint, while homes built after 1978 are unlikely to have lead-based paint. The U.S. Department of Housing and Urban Development's Office of Healthy Homes and Lead Hazard Control performs regular studies of housing-based health hazards in the U.S.

== See also ==
- Adult Blood Lead Epidemiology and Surveillance
- Environmental issues with paint
- Environmental issues in the United States
- Lead abatement in the United States
- Lead safe work practices
- Lead abatement
