= Lead paint =

Paint containing lead compounds as pigments

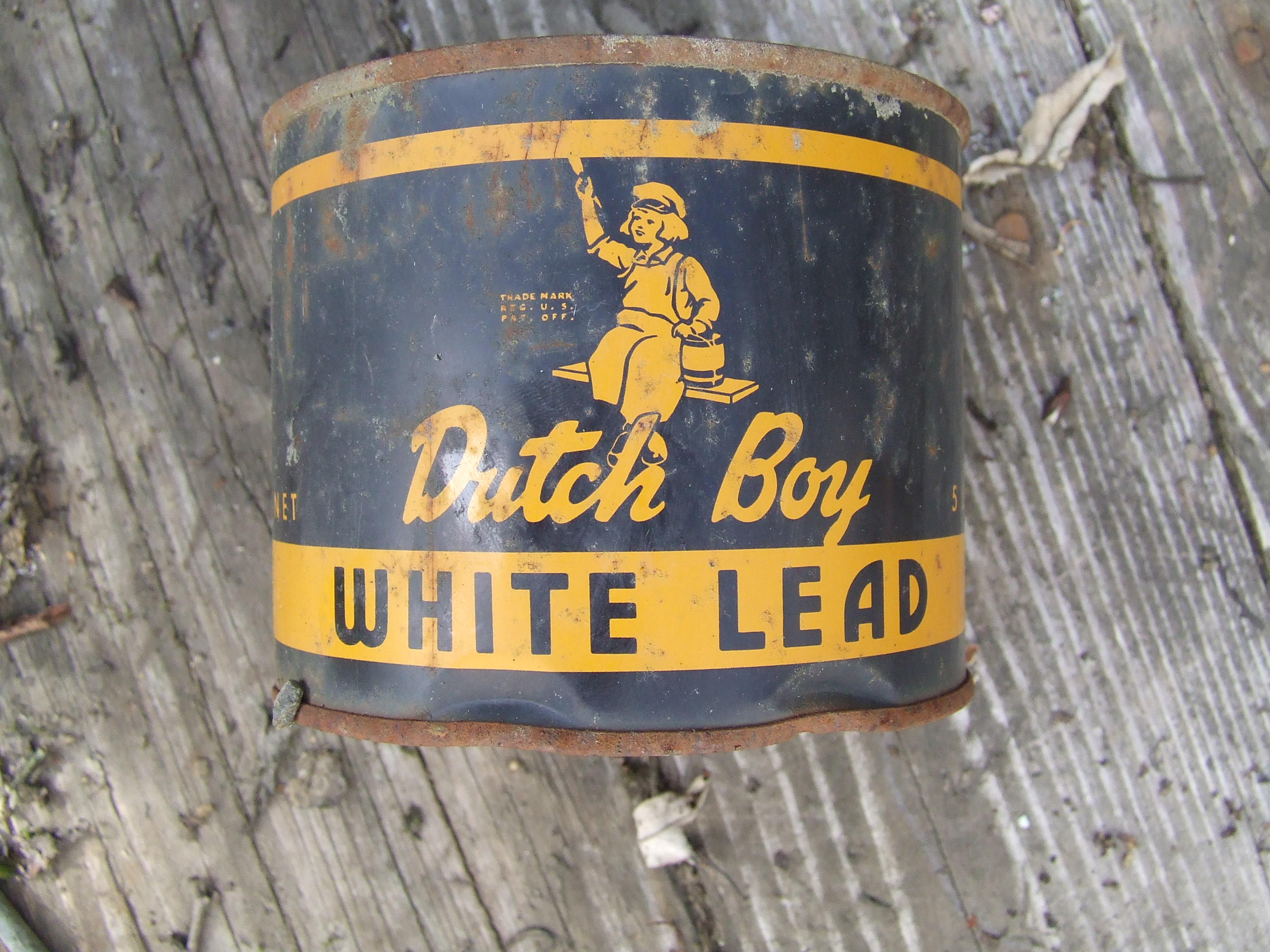
Dutch Boy Paint logo (front)

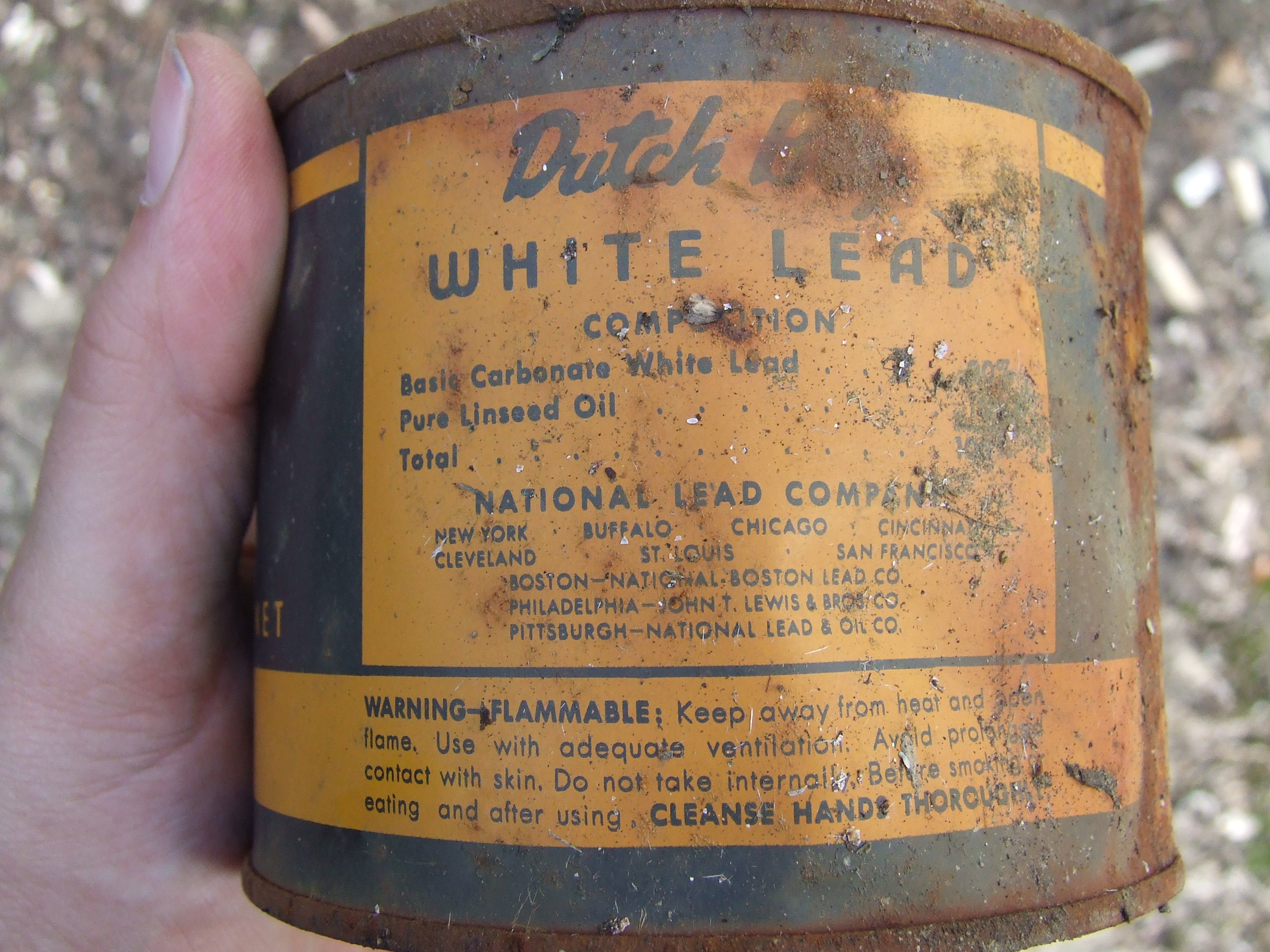
Dutch Boy Paint logo (rear)

Lead paint or lead-based paint is paint containing lead. As pigment, lead(II) chromate (PbCrO_{4}, "chrome yellow"), lead(II,IV) oxide (Pb_{3}O_{4}, "red lead"), and lead(II) carbonate (PbCO_{3}, "white lead") are the most common forms. Lead is added to paint to accelerate drying, increase durability, maintain a fresh appearance, and resist moisture that causes corrosion. It is one of the main health and environmental hazards associated with paint. Lead paint has been generally phased out of use due to the toxic nature of lead. Alternatives such as water-based, lead-free traffic paint are readily available.

In many countries, lead paint remains permitted for domestic use, whereas in other jurisdictions, such as the United States, the United Kingdom and the European Union, there are regulations prohibiting or restricting its use. However, lead paint may still be found in older properties painted prior to the introduction of such regulations. Although lead has been banned from household paints in the United States since 1978, it may still be found in road marking paint and artists' paints.

== History ==
White lead was being produced during the 4th century BC; the process is described by Pliny the Elder, Vitruvius, and the ancient Greek author Theophrastus.

The traditional method of making the pigment was called the stack process. Hundreds or thousands of earthenware pots containing vinegar and lead were embedded in a layer of either tan bark or cow dung. The pots were designed so that the vinegar and lead were in separate compartments, but the lead was in contact with the vapor of the vinegar. The lead was usually coiled into a spiral and placed on a ledge inside the pot. The pot was loosely covered with a grid of lead, which allowed the carbon dioxide formed by the fermentation of the tan bark or the dung to circulate in the pot. Each layer of pots was covered by a new layer of tan, then another layer of pots. The heat created by the fermentation, acetic acid vapor, and carbon dioxide within the stack did their work, and within a month the lead coils were covered with a crust of white lead. This crust was separated from the lead, washed, and ground for pigment. This was an extremely dangerous process for the workmen. Medieval texts warned of the danger of "apoplexy, epilepsy, and paralysis" from working with lead white.

In 1786, Benjamin Franklin wrote a letter warning a friend about the hazards of lead and lead paint, which he considered well-established. Despite the risks, the pigment was very popular with artists because of its density and opacity; a small amount could cover a large surface. It was widely used by artists until the 19th century, when it was replaced by zinc white and titanium white.

The dangers of lead paint were considered well-established by the beginning of the 20th century. In the July 1904 edition of its monthly publication, Sherwin-Williams reported the dangers of paint containing lead, noting that a French expert had deemed lead paint "poisonous in a large degree, both for the workmen and for the inhabitants of a house painted with lead colors". As early as 1886, German health laws prohibited women and children from working in factories processing lead paint and lead sugar.

The League of Nations began efforts to ban lead paint in 1921.

== Toxicity ==
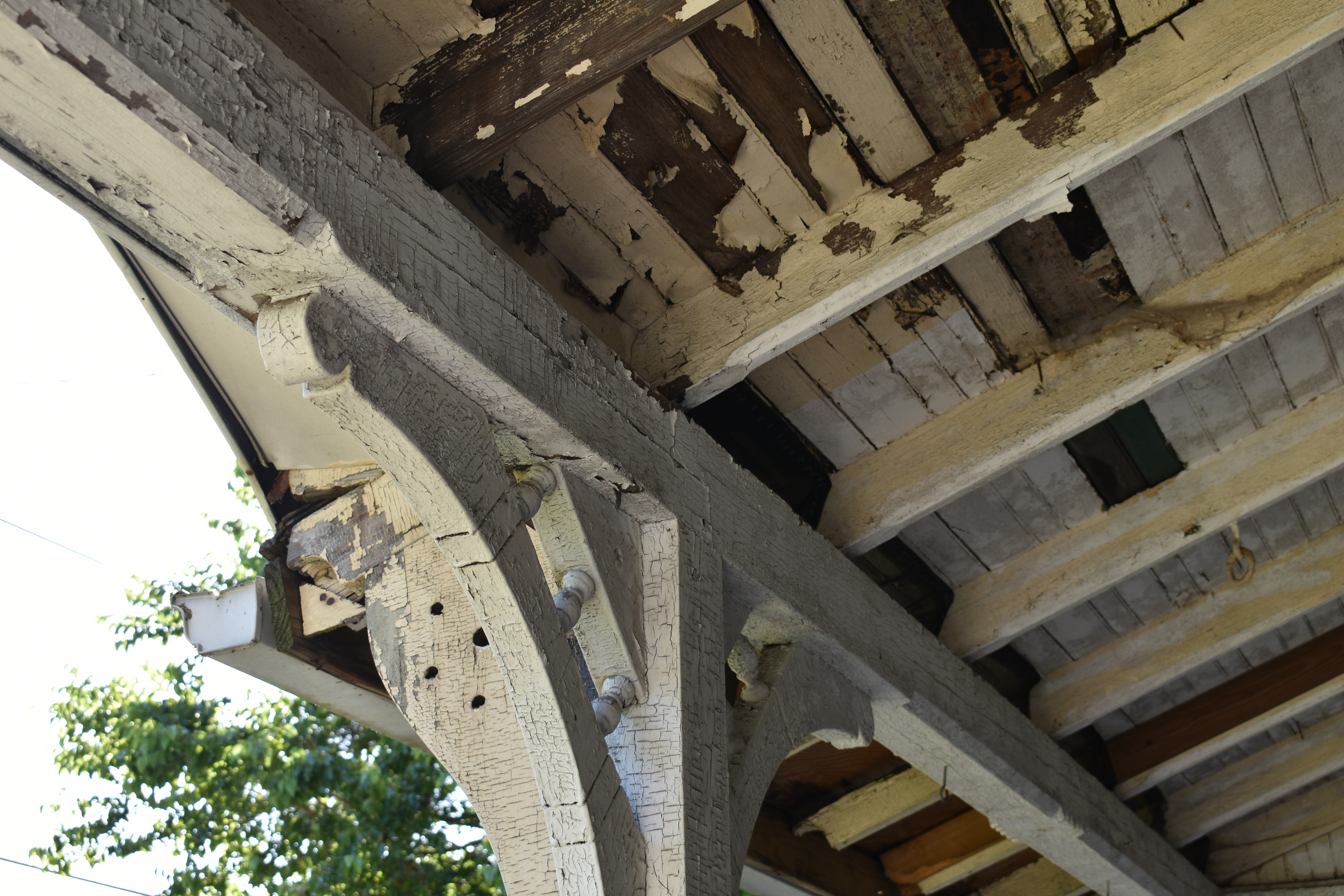
Lead paint can crack and form flakes, which then contaminate the surrounding environment.

Lead paint is hazardous. It can cause nervous system damage, stunted growth, kidney damage, and delayed development. It is associated with high violent crime rates. It is dangerous to children because it tastes sweet, therefore encouraging children to put lead chips and toys with lead dust in their mouths. Lead paint can cause reproductive problems, including a decrease in sperm concentration in men. Lead is also considered a likely carcinogen. High levels of exposure can be lethal. Several methods exist to test for the presence of lead in paint, including analysis in a laboratory and various at-home tests, with varying efficacies. Spot test kits for lead are sold to consumers, but were found by one study to have high error rates.

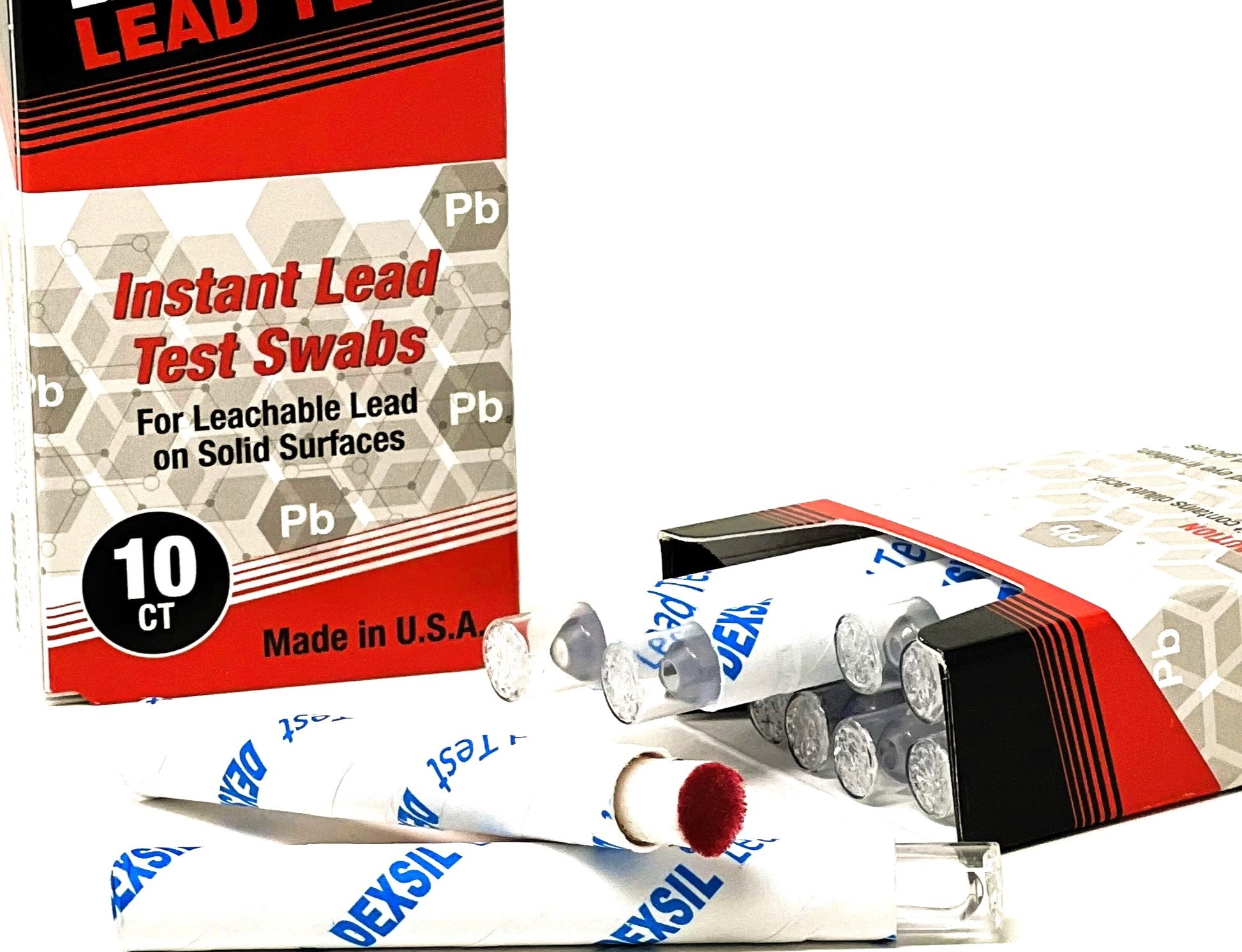
Lead test swabs have been found unreliable by scientific study.

== Regulation ==
As of 30 December 2021, these are the places with confirmed lead paint laws according to the WHO Global Health Observatory Database:

| Africa | Algeria; Cameroon; Ethiopia; Kenya; Morocco (new since 1 January 2021); South Africa; Tanzania |
| Latin America and the Caribbean | Argentina; Brazil; Chile; Colombia; Costa Rica; Cuba; Dominic; Ecuador; Guyana; Mexico; Panama; Peru (new since 1 January 2021); Trinidad and Tobago; Uruguay |
| West Asia | Iraq; Israel; Jordan (existing laws revised); Lebanon; Qatar; Oman |
| Asia and the Pacific | Australia; Bangladesh; China; India; Kyrgyzstan; Laos (new since 1 January 2021); Nepal; New Zealand; Pakistan; Philippines; Sri Lanka; Thailand; Vietnam |
| Europe | Armenia; Austria; Belarus; Belgium; Bulgaria; Croatia; Cyprus; Czech Republic; Denmark; Estonia; Finland; France; Georgia (new since 1 January 2021); Germany; Greece; Hungary; Iceland; Ireland; Italy; Latvia; Liechtenstein; Lithuania; Luxembourg; Malta; Monaco; Montenegro; Netherlands; North Macedonia; Norway; Poland; Portugal; Romania; Russia; Serbia; Slovakia; Slovenia; Spain; Sweden; Switzerland; Turkey (new since 16 January 2024); Ukraine (new since 1 January 2021); United Kingdom |
| North America | Canada; United States |

=== Africa ===
==== South Africa ====
In South Africa, the Hazardous Substances Act of 2009 classified lead as a hazardous substance and limited its use in paint to 600 parts per million (ppm). An amendment taking effect in May 2025 modified this to 90 ppm. The amendment also included all industrial paints, which were previously excluded. From May 2026, all packaging must also comply, displaying the text "Conforms with the South African legal lead limit of 90 ppm or less".

==== Elsewhere in Africa ====
As of January 2026, Burundi, Democratic Republic Congo, Niger, Sierra Leone and Zimbabwe have all made progress towards a regulatory framework on lead reduction.

=== Canada ===
In Canada, regulations were first enacted under the Hazardous Products Act in 1976 that limited lead content of paints and other liquid coatings on furniture, household products, children's products, and exterior and interior surfaces of any building frequented by children to 0.5% by weight. New regulations on surface coating materials, which came into force in 2005, further limit lead to its background level for both interior and exterior paints sold to consumers. Canadian paint manufacturers have been conforming to this background level in their interior and exterior consumer paints since 1991. Nevertheless, a Canadian company, Dominion Colour Corporation, is "the largest manufacturer of lead-based paint pigments in the world" and has faced public criticism for obtaining permission from the European Chemicals Agency to continue to export lead chromate paints from its Dutch subsidiary to countries where its uses are not tightly regulated.

=== China ===
New regulation effective from 1 December 2020 updates an older lead paint standard introduced in the 1980s, which measured soluble lead in products instead of total lead. Measuring soluble lead is considered to be a less accurate method for measuring the amount of lead paint exposure in children. The new standards set a 90 ppm total lead limit for woodware coatings and architectural wall coatings. For vehicle and industrial coatings the new total lead limit is 1,000 ppm.

=== European Union ===
Lead paint is addressed by several EU laws in the European Union. The 2003 Restriction of Hazardous Substances Directive (RoHS) forbids hazardous substances in electrical and electronic equipment (EEE). The EU 2006 REACH Regulation addresses the production and use of chemical substances, and their potential impacts on both human health and the environment, and it has been described as the most complex legislation in the European Union's history. These acts superseded and harmonized existing laws of the member states, many of which had banned lead paint years before.

To protect the health of painters, France had passed in 1909 a law banning the use of paints containing lead for the painting of the interior and exterior of all buildings.

=== Hong Kong ===
As of 2023, there are no regulation and legislation on lead content in paints. Furthermore, unlike the U.S., which implemented stricter rules in 2010, renovators in Hong Kong do not need to be certified when performing lead paint related works. Methods used to remove lead-based-paint (e.g., use of power tools) are not regulated as well. The use of HEPA-filtered vacuum or a HEPA filtered dust collection system is also not mandatory. No dust test on lead level is required upon the end of any renovation or remodeling job.

=== India ===
Lead paint was not prohibited in India until 2016. A 2015 study found that over 31% of household paints in India (small brands manufactured by small and medium enterprises in India, with limited local reach and distribution) had lead concentration above 10,000 parts per million (ppm), which far exceeds the BIS standard of 90 ppm for lead in paint. The Regulation on Lead Contents in Household and Decorative Paint Rules came into effect on 1 November 2017, according to which the paints should have lead less than 90 ppm and their label should say so. However, two years later, an analysis of 32 locally-manufactured paint samples from nine states found lead content ranging from 10 ppm to 186,062 ppm, with 90% of samples having lead levels above 90 ppm.

=== Philippines ===
The Philippines banned lead paint in 2013, but in 2017, 15% of the paint still was not certified. The EcoWaste Coalition and the Philippine Association of Paint Manufacturers declared on 1 January 2020 that the Philippines has phased-out lead paint following the implementation of Department of Environment and Natural Resources (DENR) Administrative Order 2013–24, or the Chemical Control Order for Lead and Lead Compounds, which directed manufacturers of lead-containing paints for industrial uses to phase out such paints by 31 December 2019.

=== Singapore ===
Since 1 February 1995, labelling is required for paints with total lead concentrations exceeding 600 ppm. From 3 January 2022, the manufacture, import and sale of paints exceeding 90ppm total lead concentration for local use were banned, except for zinc-based anti-corrosion paints and copper-based anti-fouling paints. For export and re-export a Hazardous Substance Licence is required ( except for zinc-based anti-corrosion paints and copper-based anti-fouling paints). For local sale of zinc-based anti-corrosion paints and copper-based anti-fouling paints exceeding 90ppm total lead concentration labelling is required and only industrial uses are allowed.

=== United Kingdom ===
In the United Kingdom, lead paint was banned from sale to the general public in 1992, except for specialist uses.

=== United States ===
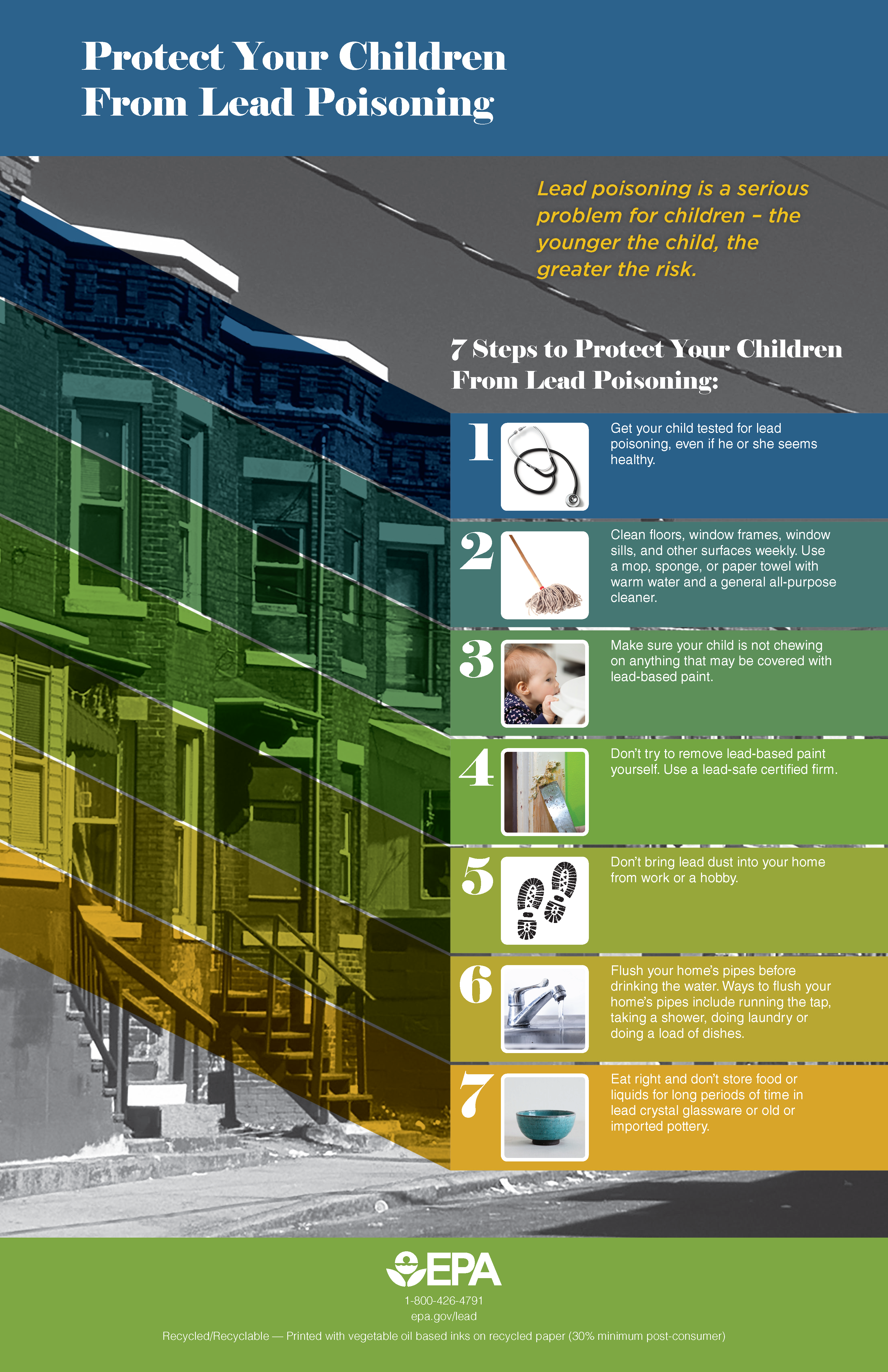
EPA poster on protecting children from lead poisoning

The U.S. Consumer Product Safety Commission (CPSC) banned lead paint in 1977 in residential properties and public buildings (16 CFR 1303), along with toys and furniture containing lead paint. The cited reason was "to reduce the risk of lead poisoning in children who may ingest paint chips or peelings". For manufacturers, the CPSC instituted the Consumer Product Safety Improvement Act of 2008, which changed the cap on lead content in paint from 0.06% to 0.009% starting 14 August 2009. In 2018 the State of Delaware banned the use of lead paint on outdoor structures. Also, the Residential Lead-Based Paint Hazard Reduction Act (a.k.a. the "Lead Paint Act") was created in order to ensure that the disclosure of any lead-based hazards in a building be discussed with potential buyers or renters of units. While EPA and HUD have defined LBP as being 1.0 mg/cm^{2} (as measure by XRF) or 0.5% lead by dry weight (aka 5,000 ppm), some states and municipalities gone beyond this. For example, New York City's Local Law 66 of 2019 defines LBP as 0.500 mg/cm^{2} (XRF) or 0.25% lead dry weight (2,500 ppm).

In April 2010, the U.S. Environmental Protection Agency (EPA) required that all renovators working in homes built before 1978 and disturbing more than 6 square feet (0.56 m^{2}) of lead paint inside the home or 20 square feet (1.9 m^{2}) outside the home be certified. EPA's Lead Renovation, Repair and Painting Rule (RRP Rule) lowers the risk of lead contamination from home renovation activities. It requires that firms performing renovation, repair, and painting projects that disturb lead-based paint in homes, child care facilities and pre-schools (any child occupied facility) built before 1978 be certified by EPA and use certified renovators who are trained by EPA-approved training providers to follow lead-safe work practices.

Careful stabilization of any deteriorated (peeling, chipping, cracking, etc.) paint in a lead-safe manner is also encouraged. Through authority vested in the United States Department of Housing and Urban Development (HUD), lead-based-paint removal by dry scraping, dry sanding, torching and burning, the use of heat guns over 1100 °F, and machine-sanding / grinding without a HEPA-filtered vacuum or a HEPA filtered dust collection system, is prohibited, as these methods have been proven to produce significant amount of lead dust during renovation, remodeling and painting.

At the end of any remodeling or repainting job, a dust test performed by an independent third-party professional is also required by HUD for "clearance". Lead evaluations are done using a method called X-Ray fluorescence (XRF), which gives a result in 4–8 seconds with a 95% accuracy at the 2-sigma level.

As of 2018, there are an estimated 37 million homes and apartments with lead paint in the United States.

== Lead paint in art ==
=== Oil paints ===
In art, white lead paint is known as flake white or Cremnitz white. It is valued for the ease of handling and resilience the lead confers to oil paints. Lead white paint dries relatively quickly to form a strong, flexible paint film. Lead-based white is one of the oldest manufactured pigments. It was the only white pigment available to artists in appreciable quantities until the twentieth century, when zinc white and titanium white became available. Industrially produced lead white, the typical pigment from the 19th century until its ban, was thought to be inferior to traditionally fabricated forms, which had larger "flake" particles that conferred ease of handling.

Titanium and zinc whites are far less toxic than lead white and have largely supplanted it in most fine arts applications. Safety regulations have also made lead white more expensive and difficult to obtain in some regions, such as the EU. Lead white oil paints are still produced and in use by artists who prefer their unique handling, mixing, and structural qualities. Lead white has also shown to have extended longevity compared to zinc and titanium, which will crack much earlier. Lead white is preferred by some artists for its warmer tone, compared with the colder titanium and zinc whites.

Flake white has various drawbacks, including a tendency to become transparent over time. It also blackens in the presence of certain atmospheric pollutants, although this can be reversed.

=== Water-based paints ===
Lead is not a traditional pigment in water media, as zinc is superior for works on paper, as is calcium hydroxide (slaked lime) for frescos. Lead-based paints, when used on paper, often cause the work to become discolored after long periods; the paint's lead carbonate reacts with hydrogen sulfide in the air and with acids, which often come from fingerprints.

== Substitutes ==
=== Titanium ===
Paint manufacturers have replaced white lead with a less toxic substitute, titanium dioxide, which was first used in paints in the 19th century. Titanium dioxide is considered safe enough to use as a food coloring and in toothpaste, and is a common ingredient in sunscreen. Titanium white has far greater opacity and tinting strength than lead white, and it can easily overpower most other pigments if not mixed carefully. Titanium white has been criticized for leading to "chalkiness" in mixtures.

=== Zinc ===
Zinc white is less opaque and weaker in tinting strength than either titanium white or lead white. It is commonly used to lighten mixtures subtly while maintaining transparency. Although zinc white is the standard white in watercolors, its structural soundness in oils has been debated. Zinc white dries slowly and creates a relatively inflexible paint film. Critics of the pigment argue that its use leads to excessive cracking and delamination, even when used sparingly.

== See also ==
- Environmental issues with paint
- Lead-based paint in the United Kingdom
- Lead-based paint in the United States
- Lead Exposure Elimination Project
- Lead tetroxide
- Lead–crime hypothesis
- Lead abatement

== Bibliography ==
- Rutherford J. Gettens; Hermann Kühn; W. T. Chase (1967). "Identification of the Materials of Paintings: Lead White". Studies in Conservation. 12 (4): 125–139. doi:10.2307/1505410. JSTOR 1505410.
- Ball, Philip (2001). Bright Earth- Art and the Invention of Colour. Penguin Group. ISBN 9782754105033.
- Gifford, Donald G (2010). Suing the Tobacco and Lead Pigment Industries: Government Litigation as Public Health Prescription. Ann Arbor: University of Michigan Press. ISBN 978-0-472-11714-7.
- Thomson, Daniel (1956). The Materials and Techniques of Medieval Painting. Dover Publications. ISBN 0-486-20327-1.
