= Lead-based paint in the United Kingdom =

Most lead-based paint in the United Kingdom were banned from sale to the general public in 1992, except for specialist uses. Prior to this, lead compounds had been used as the pigment and drying agent in different types of paint, for example brick and some tile paints. Lead-based paint has been an important cause of lead poisoning.

== Early regulatory debates (1911–1915) ==
In response to rising concerns over occupational lead poisoning, the Home Secretary appointed a departmental committee in January 1911 to investigate dangers in the building industry. This inquiry catalysed a major debate between public works administrators and private trade associations regarding the feasibility of a total ban on white lead. H.M. Office of Works advocated heavily for a transition to zinc oxide alternatives. Under the institutional direction of Principal Architect Sir Henry Tanner, West London Clerk of Works George Dobson Patterson evaluated extensive real-world trials testing customised zinc formulas on major Crown properties, including royal residences like Buckingham Palace and the Post Office Savings Bank building at Blythe House. Patterson formulated an alternative by thickening the paint with a 60–70% concentration of zinc oxide and using refined boiled linseed oil with manganese borate driers to correct slow drying times.

The proposed restrictions faced pushback from traditional trade groups, including the National Association of Master House Painters and Decorators. Industry representatives challenged the findings, arguing that the government's four-to-six-year trial windows were too short to prove long-term outdoor weather resistance, and claiming that non-lead alternatives were chemically inferior, harder to dry, and more expensive. Patterson was recalled to testify three separate times to defend the financial and structural viability of the zinc formula against these industry claims. The committee ultimately recommended a law restricting paints to no more than 5 percent soluble lead, though full nationwide statutory bans were deferred for decades.

== White lead paint ==
Until the early 1960s white lead (lead carbonate/lead sulphate) was added in substantial quantities as the main white pigment in some paint products intended for use as a primer or top coat over metal and wood, both internally and externally. Examples of where this type of paint may have been used are skirting boards, doors, door frames, stairs, banisters, window frames and sills, wooden flooring, radiators, and pipes, though it could also have been applied to any other surface at this time e.g. plaster walls.

Prior to this the concentration of white lead in paint rose to its highest levels between the years 1930 and 1955, as much as half the volume in some paints, meaning many post-war UK houses have significant amounts of lead in original paint layers.

In the 1950s, alternative white pigments, such as titanium dioxide, were introduced.

In 1963 a voluntary agreement was made between the then Paintmakers' Association, now the British Coatings Federation, and the UK Government that resulted in labeling of paint that contained more than 1% of lead in dry film, with a warning that it should not be applied to surfaces accessible to children. However white lead-based paints remained in the supply chain and were therefore still in use for some time.

Following this, white lead continued to be added to some paint available to professional decorators for specialist use. Additionally, paint with low white lead levels was applied as a thin primer coat to some pre-fabricated domestic wooden windows until the early 1980s.

In 1992 European Union legislation was implemented within the UK by the Environmental Protection, part of the Department for Environment, Food and Rural Affairs (DEFRA), as the Controls on Injurious Substances Regulations. This prevented the addition of white lead to almost all paints except those intended for use in historic buildings and as artwork.

== Red lead ==
The lead-based pigments (lead tetroxide, calcium plumbate, or "red lead") were widely used as an anti-corrosive primer coating over exterior steelwork. This type of paint might have been applied to garden gates and railings, guttering and downpipes and other external iron and steelwork.

Similar red lead-based compounds were also widely used as a jointing compound in engineering, to form steam- or oil-tight flanged joints in pipework.

Red lead in paint was not banned by the 1992 legislation or by more recent EU REACH regulations and the SPAB confirm it is technically available in the UK but only by special licence. In practice however it has been replaced by safer alternatives (such as red oxide) by most UK/EU paint suppliers; and indeed of those that still supply it, some mistakenly assume it is covered by the 1992 regulations and request approval from a 'competent body' before purchase.

== Coloured lead paint ==
Until the early 1970s red, yellow, orange and green lead-based pigments (lead chromate) were added to a limited number of decorative coloured gloss and wall paints. Following this non-lead alternatives were used as pigments.

However lead chromate continued to be used in yellow road markings up to the present day. Its use was supposed to cease on 21 May 2015, the sunset date set by EU REACH regulations. However a last minute request for authorization by the Canadian pigment producer Dominion Colour Corporation (DCC) has had preliminary support by the European Chemicals Agency, which if approved could see its use continue in road markings until 2022 or later.

== Lead drying agent ==
Lead (lead naphthenate) was added as a drying agent to some types of paint to ensure the paint surface hardened. In the 1960s this practice was phased out for ordinary paint available to the general public, however its use has not (so far) been banned by legislation.

== Advocacy ==
The Lead Paint Safety Association (LiPSA) is a not-for-profit UK organisation that aims to promote awareness and best practice in lead paint safety and compliance. LiPSA's objective is to prevent and ultimately to eliminate childhood and occupational lead poisoning. LiPSA was founded by Tristan Olivier.

LiPSA's members include individuals and organisations, especially those in the area of lead paint testing and removal and offers web-based, email and telephone advice in relation to lead paint, including testing strategies. LiPSA also offers an emergency telephone support line for child lead poisoning and/or occupational exposure concerns.

== See also ==
- Environmental issues with paint
- Lead abatement
