= Austin ReBlend =

Paint recycling program

- Type: Environmental
- Location: 2514 Business Center Drive
- Coordinates: 30.21346°N 97.73724°W
- Region served: Central Texas
- Products: Recycled paint

Austin ReBlend is a paint recycling program administered by the City of Austin in Austin, Texas. In 2012, Austin ReBlend produced 12,767 US gal (48,330 L) of wholly recycled paint.

== History ==
In 2009, Austin ReBlend received a grant to purchase equipment that allowed it to process and manufacture paint on-site, as opposed to through an independent contractor, which raised its production efficiency substantially.

== Production ==
Texas Limestone, left, Balcones Canyonland, center, and Barton Creek Greenbelt, right, are the three colors of paint produced by the service as of 2022.

The service aggregates locally recycled latex paint, processes and analyzes it for quality control, and then retrofits candidate material into a new 100% post-consumer, low-volatile organic compound product. In order to optimize manufacturing efficiency and to provide a stable consumer product, Austin ReBlend produces two pliable shades of beige: Texas Limestone and Balcones Canyonland, as well as a shade of green: Barton Creek Greenbelt. According to annual reports, the service produced 8,333 gallons of recycled paint during 2011. This number increased to 12,767 US gal (48,330 L) in 2012. It is also experimenting and researching new ways to improve its process.

== Distribution ==
Austin ReBlend operates out of the Household Hazardous Waste Facility in Southeast Austin.

== Availability ==
The service's recycled paint is made available free of charge to individuals and nonprofit civic organizations. A blacklist is also maintained to deter excessive exploitation of the service.
