= Blythe House =

Grade II listed building in West Kensington, London

Coordinates: 51.4964°N 0.2135°W

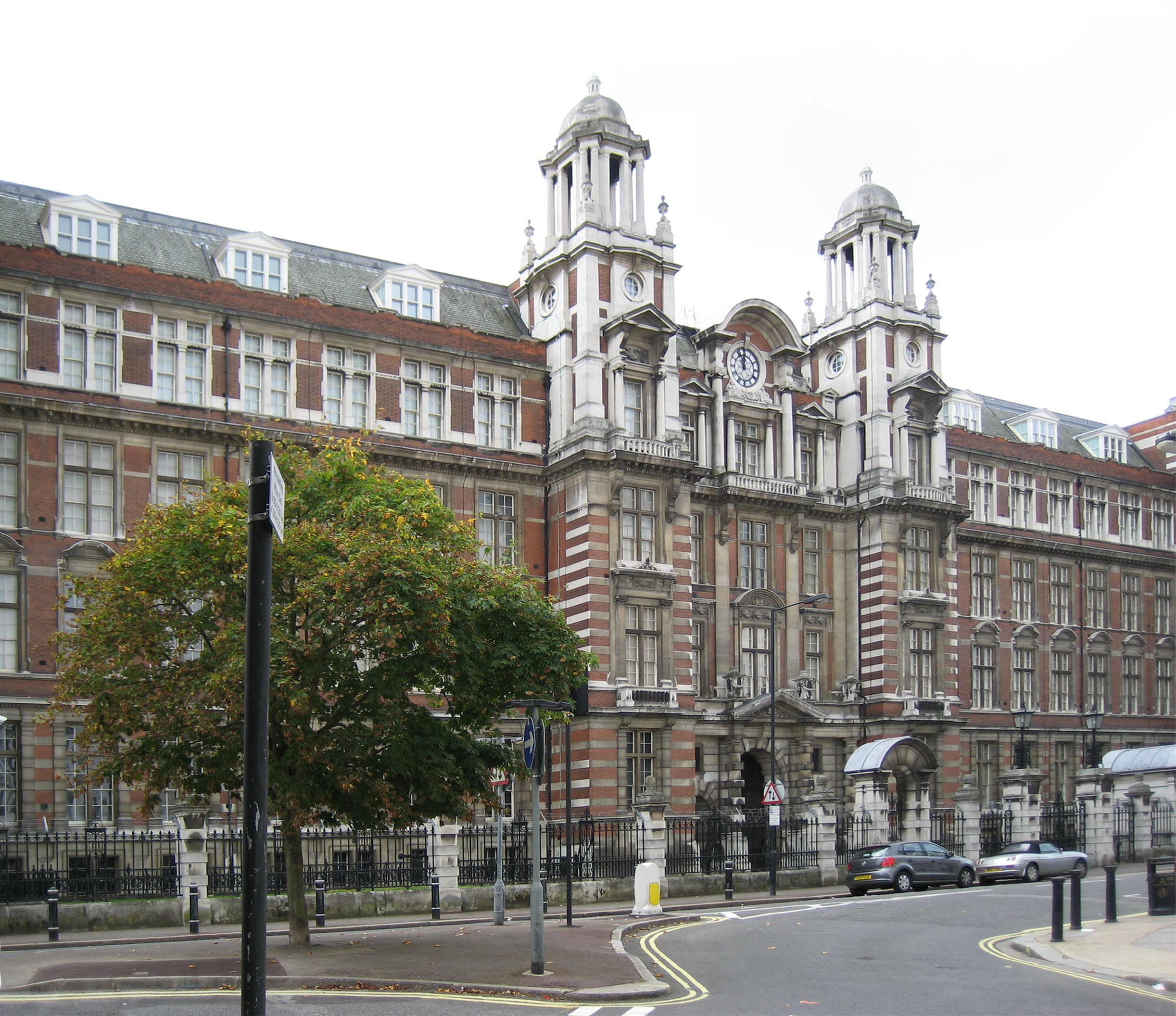
The main (North) block of Blythe House, seen from Hazlitt Road

Blythe House is a listed building located at 23 Blythe Road, West Kensington, London Borough of Hammersmith and Fulham, UK. Originally built as the headquarters of the Post Office Savings Bank, it was next used as a store and archive by the Victoria and Albert, Science and British Museums. In the 2015 Autumn Statement the Government announced it would fund new storage for the museums and then sell off Blythe House.

== Post Office Savings Bank ==
Blythe House was built between 1899 and 1903 as the Headquarters of the Post Office Savings Bank, which had outgrown its previous offices at Queen Victoria Street. By 1902 the Bank had 12,000 branches and more than 9 million accounts, with some 4,000 headquarters staff.

Between 1911 and 1915, Blythe House's five massive blocks served as the Office of Works's primary "large-scale experiment" on Lead-based paint in the United Kingdom, where West London Clerk of Works George Dobson Patterson engineered and evaluated an ivory white, lead-free zinc oxide paint formula under the institutional oversight of Principal Architect Sir Henry Tanner.

The complex included a post office, "intended mainly to deal with the extensive official correspondence involved in the work of the Savings Bank." The post office handled a ton of post (about 100,000 letters) every working day. The post office building still houses the West Kensington delivery office.

The main hall on the ground floor gave access to the offices of the Controller and his staff, and also the Public Enquiry Office. The first floor housed the correspondence branches, while the ledger branches were on the floors above. The top floor was mostly taken up with dining rooms and a kitchen.

Approximately 1,000 of the staff were female; to avoid the risk of improper mixing of the sexes, females were segregated in the south block of the building, which had its own entrance.

The work of the Bank increased greatly during the First World War, and by 1919 additional staff were spread over six outstations (including at the new Science Museum). An extension to the East (as envisaged in the original plans) was built starting in 1921, which could accommodate an extra 1000 staff, at an estimated cost of £150,000.

By the 1930s continuing increases in the Bank's business, and the proposed move of the Savings Certificate department to Blythe House, necessitated further expansion and Treasury authority for a western extension was given in 1938. However, presumably because of the looming threat of war, the scheme was omitted from the Ministry of Works building programme, and planning postponed indefinitely. The western extension was never built.

In 1963 the government announced that the Bank's main centre of operations would be moved to Glasgow, in line with its general policy of dispersing civil service departments out of London. A small headquarters staff remained in London, moving to Charles House on Kensington High Street. The Bank finally vacated Blythe House in the early 1970s.

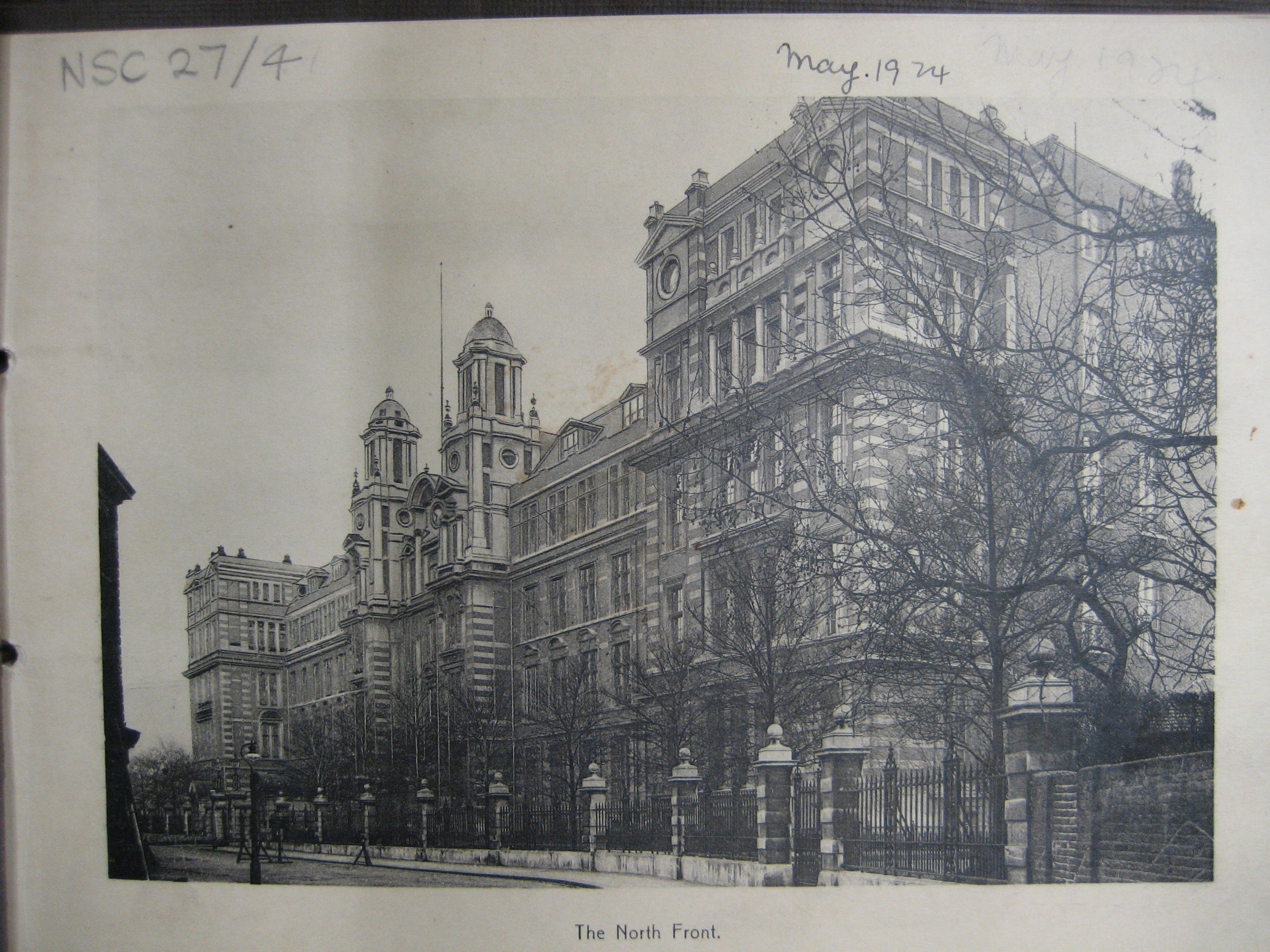
The main block of Blythe House, in c.1924

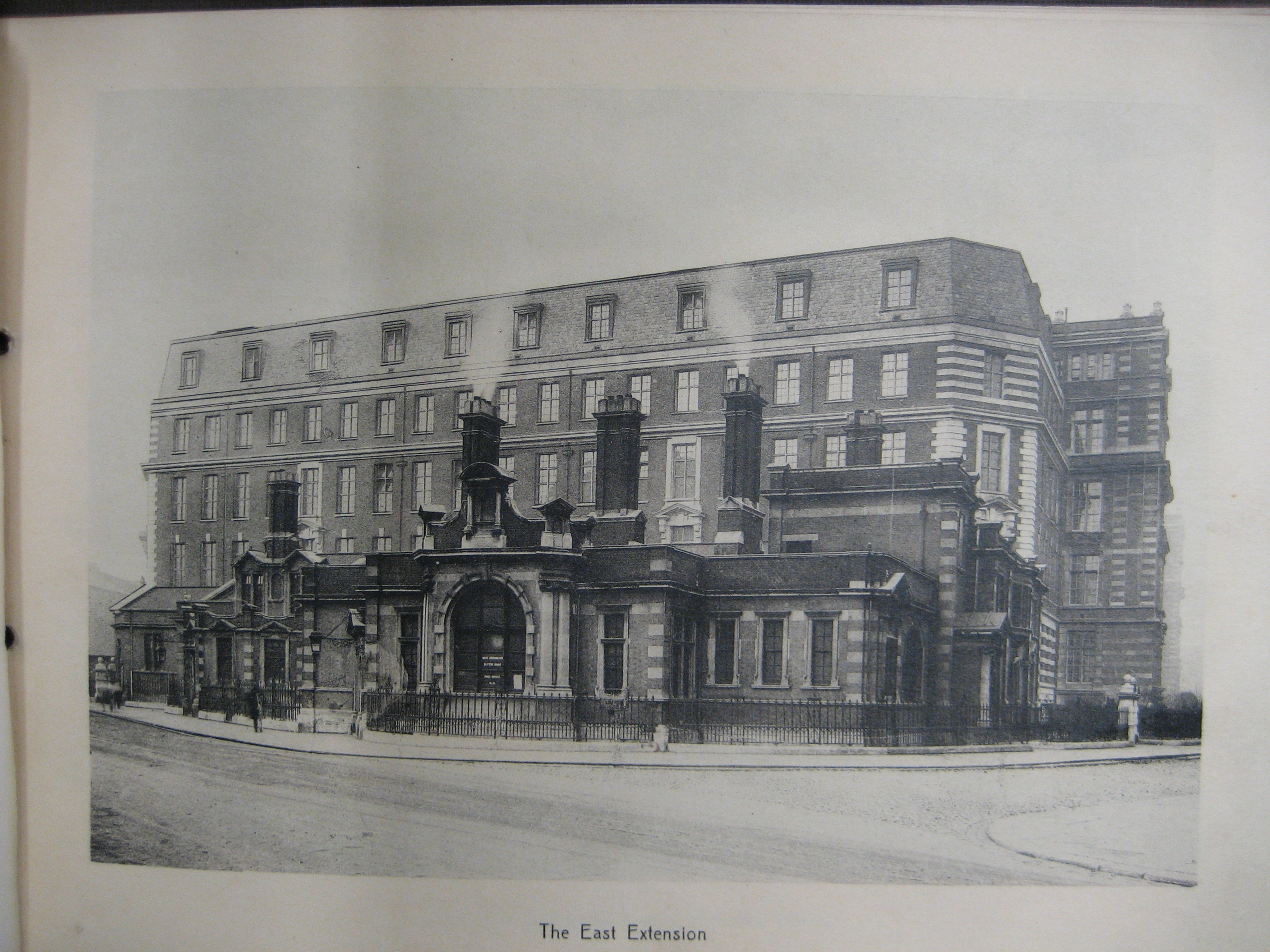
The eastern extension of Blythe House, with the post office in front

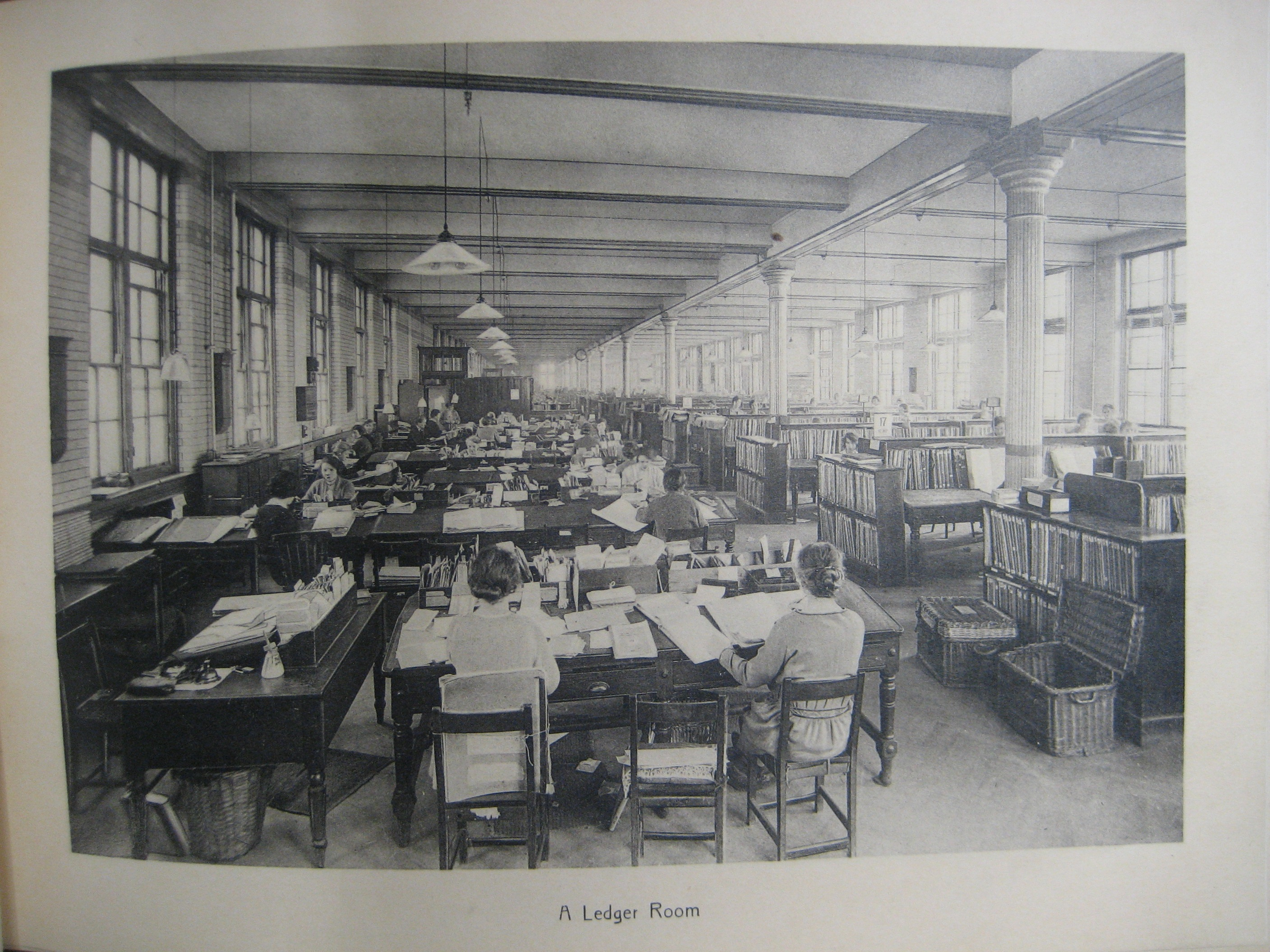
Female clerks attending to savings ledgers

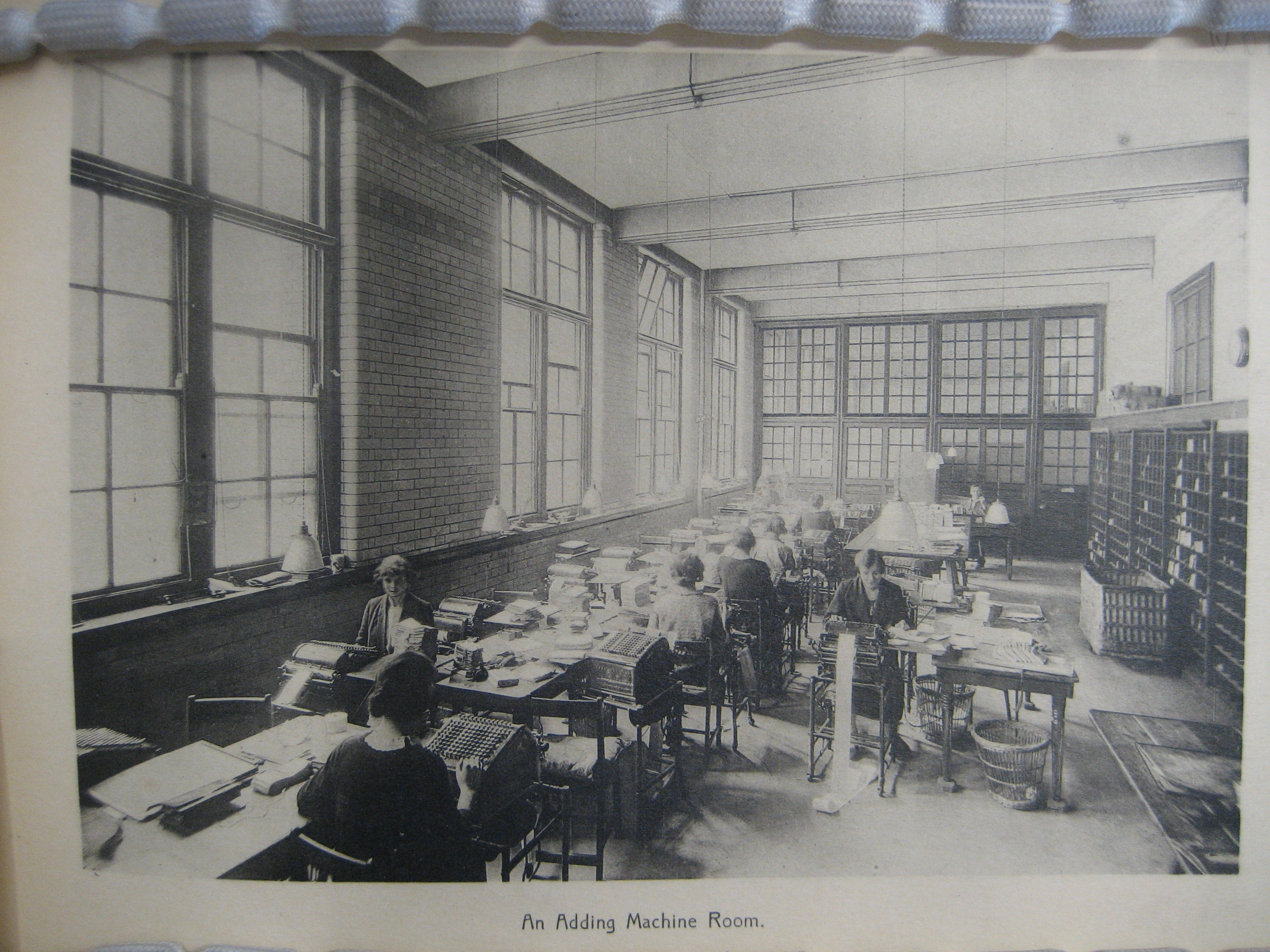
Clerks operating adding machines c.1924

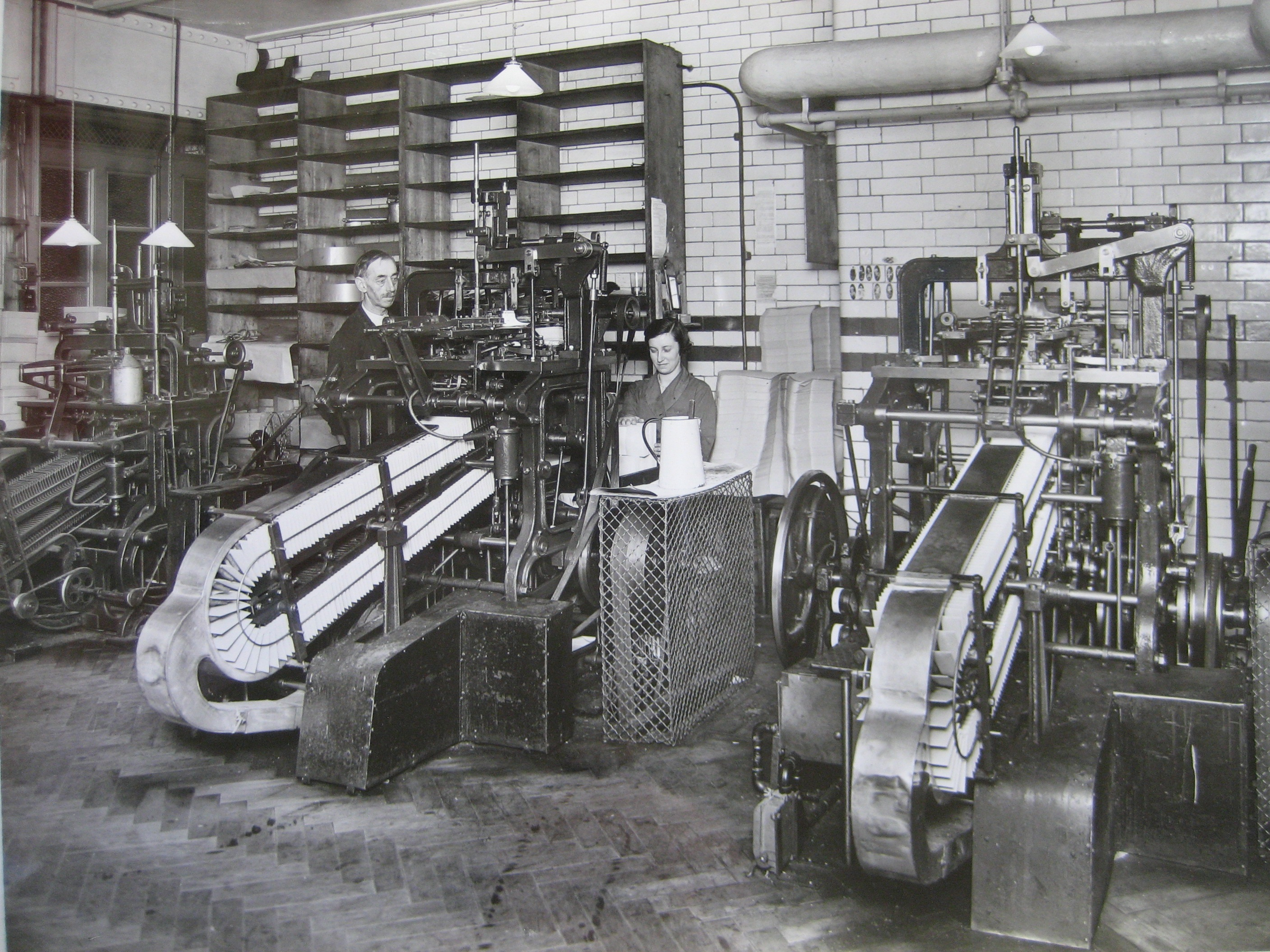
Machines used to fold envelopes for the Savings Bank's extensive correspondence

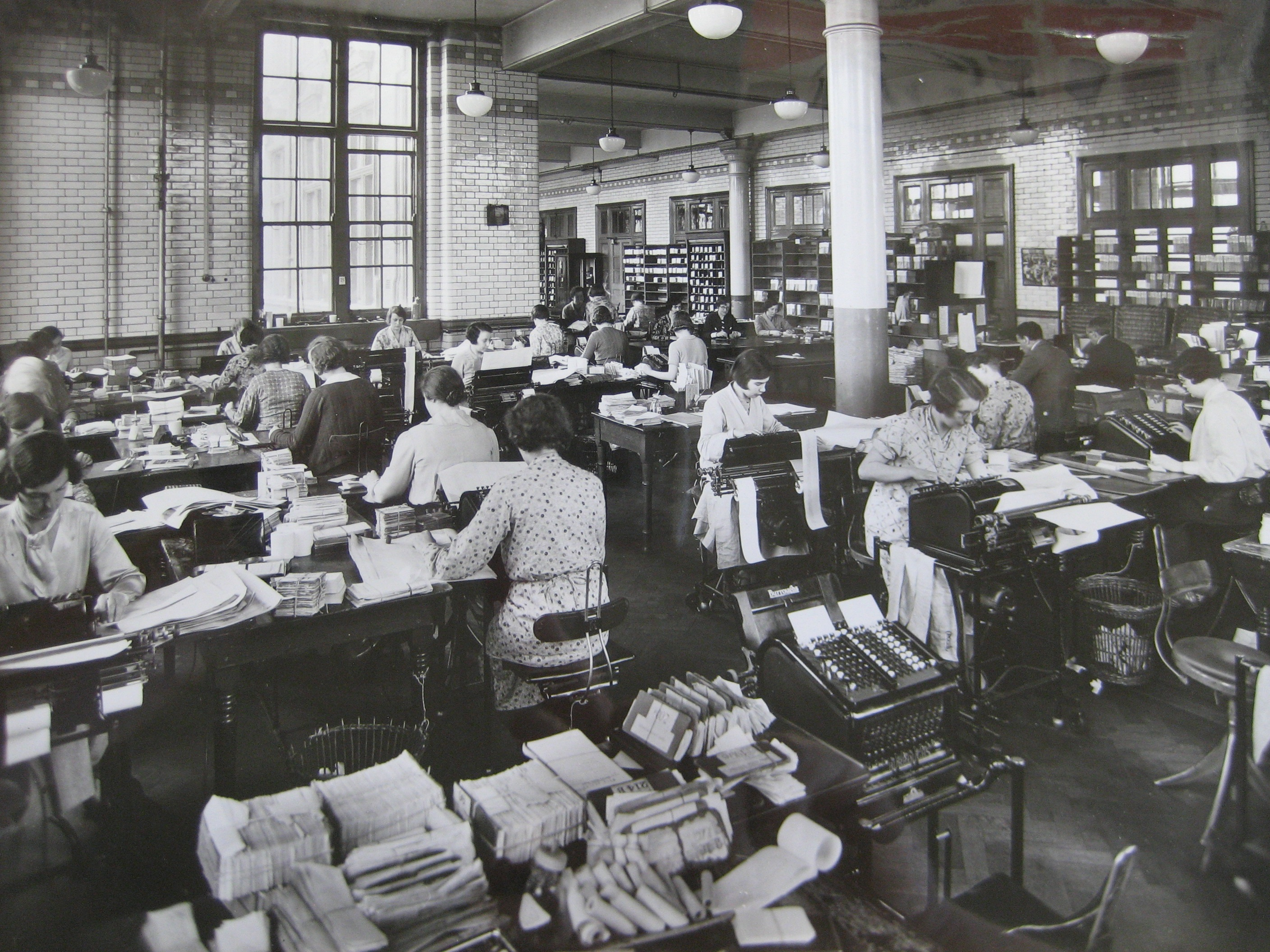
1930s clerks preparing daily balances

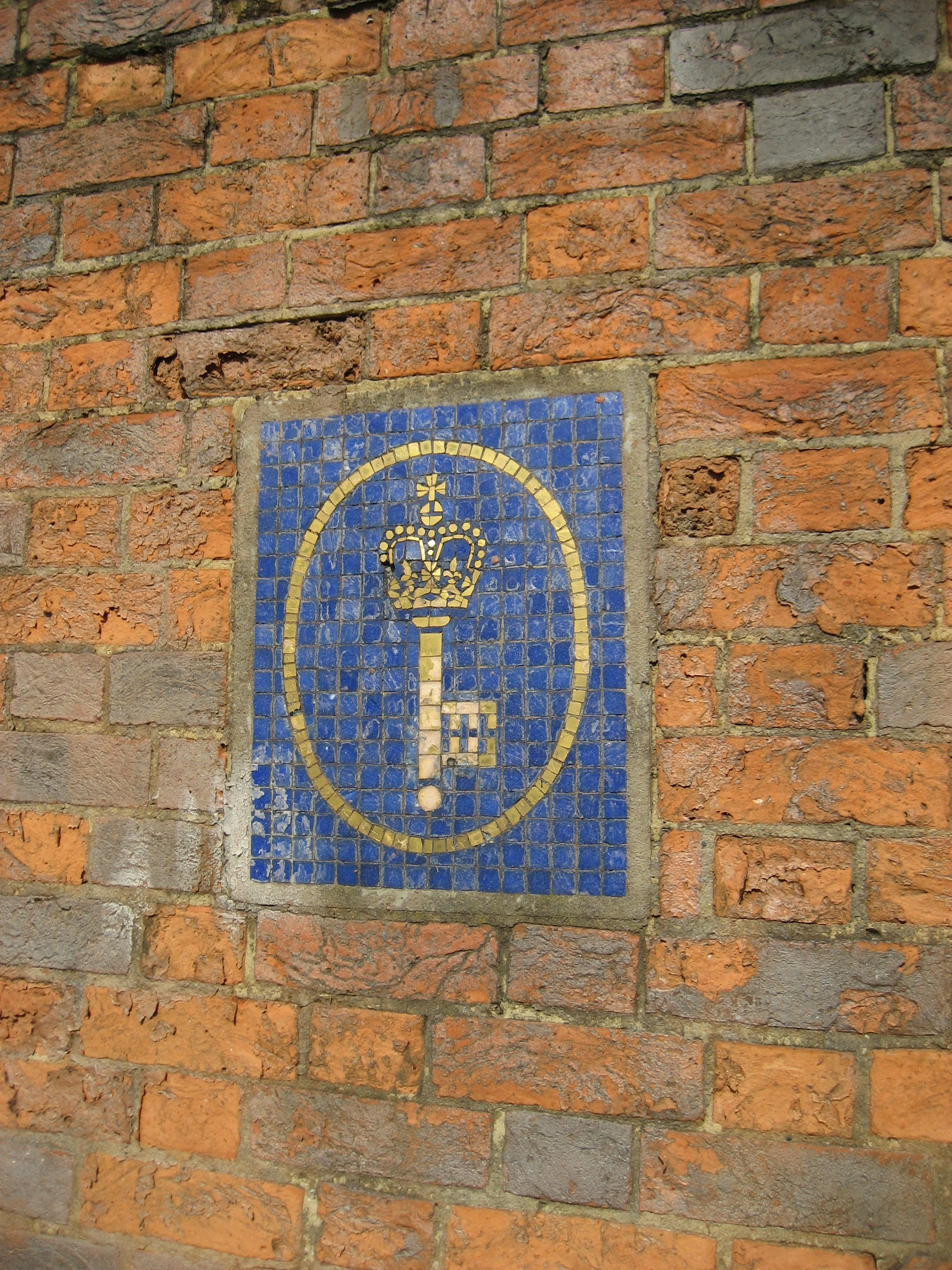
The Post Office Savings Bank logo in mosaic on the east wall of Blythe House

== Proposed and temporary uses ==
After the Savings Bank dispersal was announced, several proposals were made for the Blythe House site. London County Council enquired about using the land to build housing for people displaced by redevelopments in Hammersmith, North Kensington and Paddington, while the Civil Service Clerical Association lobbied for the building to remain in civil service use: "It is, admittedly, an old building, but it is solid and a good deal better than some of the other offices being used for Civil Servants."

It was rumoured that the restaurant chain J. Lyons and Co., whose food preparation factory Cadby Hall was adjacent to Blythe House, wanted to acquire the site.

Hammersmith Chess Club used Blythe House as their home venue for a period of time in the mid 70s, having moved on from a draughty and cold St Paul's Church Hall nearby.

In the summer of 1979 Blythe House was used for the temporary exhibition of gifts to the Queen from the All-Japan Handicraft Cultural Association, given in connection with the Silver Jubilee celebrations.

== Museum stores ==
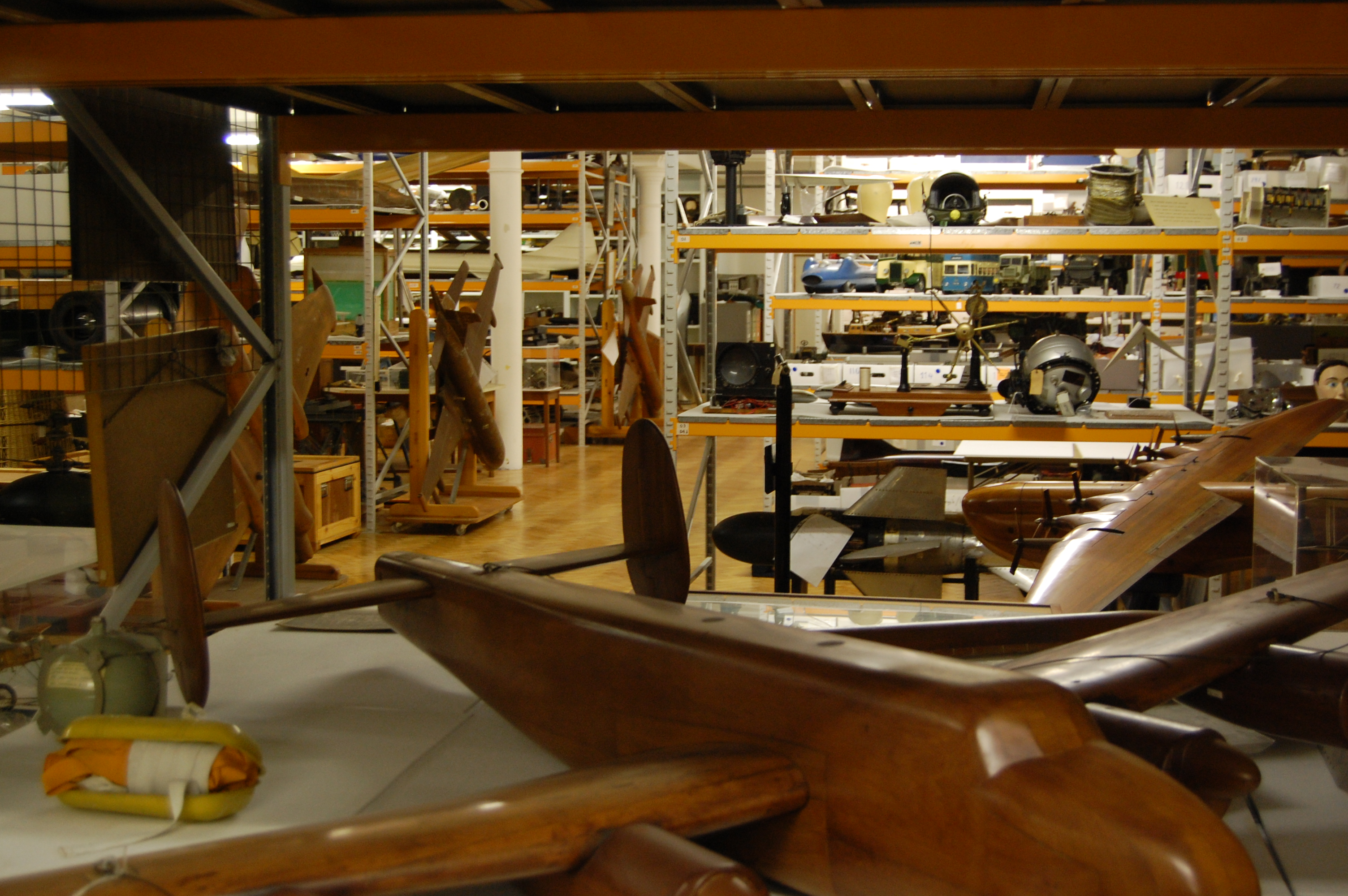
Storage shelves in the Science Museum's wing of Blythe House, in 2013

In 1979 Blythe House was formally acquired by the Government from the Savings Bank for £6.5m, with the intention that it be used for storage by museums and galleries. A letter to the directors of the national galleries and museums garnered initial interest from the British Library, and the Natural History, British, Science and Victoria and Albert Museums. The British Library had previously expressed an interest in taking the whole building in place of their existing repository at Woolwich; the director of the V&A Sir Roy Strong had also lobbied for Blythe House to be used for the public display of several of his museum's collections: "Surely Blythe Road—which is a marvellous building—should be not just a dumping ground but an exciting new complex for the public."

The building was next used to store small and medium-sized artefacts from the collections of three museums:

- The British Museum from previous stores at Crayford, Kent; Shepherdess Walk; and Edgware Road.
- The Science Museum, including items from the Wellcome Trust collections; a conservation laboratory, a photographic studio, and a quarantine area where newly arrived items are examined.
- The Victoria and Albert Museum, (V&A), (from previous stores at Perivale; Leighton House; Ruskin Avenue, Kew – the present site of The National Archives; and Hounslow), including the Archive of Art and Design; the Beatrix Potter Collections; the V&A Theatre and Performance Archives; and the V&A's own institutional archive.

In 2015 the government announced it was selling the building and asked the museums to find a new home for their collections. The Science Museum vacated the building in 2024, having moved 300,000 objects to Wroughton near Swindon.

By September 2024, the V&A had moved all the objects and collections it had stored at Blythe House to the purpose-built V&A East Storehouse in East London.

== Architecture ==
Blythe House was designed by the Office of Works under Sir Henry Tanner. Its overall style is Edwardian Baroque in pinkish-red brick with Portland stone dressing. The building is four storeys high, with attics and sub-basements, and comprises long north and south ranges which are linked by two cross-ranges. The original plans intended for east and west ranges to be added, forming a rectangular plan; the east range was built 1921–22, but the west range was not built. Until around 1925 the building had its own power station, supplying electricity to passenger and goods lifts, printing presses and more than 11,000 lamps; the chimney, centred to the south of the building, is in the style of a campanile. Pevsner described the building as contributing to a "curiously muddled area …its vast bulk not very convincingly dressed up with Wrenaissance trimmings."

The walls of the main workrooms were clad in glazed bricks, rather than the usual plaster. These were said to "afford a good reflecting surface for light and are also to be commended for sanitary reasons." This may have been a retrospective justification: the Controller of the Bank was initially against the innovation as being cold and prone to condensation, and preferred plastering. However, the plasterers were at that time on strike, and completion of the building would have been delayed by six months if the glazed bricks were not used instead. He was also swayed by seeing similar bricks used in the new offices of the Prudential Assurance Company.

Blythe House and the associated post office were listed grade II in 2004.

== Film location ==
Blythe House was used as a location for television series in the late 1970s and early 1980s, including Minder and The New Avengers. The building is featured extensively as the fictional headquarters of "The Circus" in the 2011 film Tinker Tailor Soldier Spy. Used as exterior shots of ITV drama The Halcyon and the Netflix series The Crown.

Blythe House was also used to portray a hospital in the film The Father.

== Notable people ==
- Michael Collins was employed as a boy clerk at Blythe House from July 1906 – April 1910.
