= Paint recycling =

Process of reusing paint

Paint is a recyclable item. Latex paint is collected at collection facilities in many countries and shipped to paint-recycling facilities.

== How paint is recycled ==
There are many ways that paint can be recycled. Most often, the highest quality of latex paint is sorted out and turned back into recycled paint that can be used. Recycled paint is environmentally preferable to new paint, while still maintaining comparable quality. In many cases, reusable paints of the same color are pumped into a tank where the material is mixed and tested. The paint is adjusted with additives and colorants as necessary. Finally, the paint is fine filtered and packaged for sale.

Paint that cannot be reused has other environmentally friendly uses. Non-reusable paint can be made into a product used in cement manufacturing, thereby recycling virtually 100% of the original paint.

Recycling one gallon of paint could save 13 gallons of water, 1 quart of oil, and 250,000 gallons of water pollution, 13.74 pounds of CO_{2}, save enough energy to power the average home for 3 hours.

== Paint recycling by country ==
=== Canada ===
In Ontario, Stewardship Ontario oversees the collection of waste paint from consumers and diversion from landfill to meet targets approved by the Ministry of the Environment through a program called the Orange Drop Program. The Orange Drop program is an extensive and growing network of collection sites—drop-off locations for paint leftovers and other special materials that can't go in the Blue Box or the garbage.

As an Orange Drop-approved transporter and processor, Loop Recycled Products Inc. takes leftover paint, collected through Stewardship Ontario, and turns it into environmentally friendly recycled paint. Raw material costs and energy consumption are lower than when making paint from scratch.

In February 2015, Waste Diversion Ontario approved Product Care as the new Ontario waste paint stewardship operator effectively replacing Stewardship Ontario.

In March 2017, Colortech ECO Paints introduced its line of recycled wall and floor paints to specific retail markets consisting of a large network of liquidation and discount stores across Canada and the United States, as well as exporting large quantities to West Africa and South America.

Alberta's paint recycling program started accepting leftover, unwanted paint on April 1, 2008. It is estimated that about 30 million liters of paint is sold in Alberta each year. On average, 5 to 10 percent of this ends up as waste, which can pose environmental and health risks if disposed of improperly. Paint contains many components that have great potential for reuse, recycling and recovery. The Paint Recycling Alberta program enables these products to be handled and recycled in an environmentally safe manner, reducing their impact on the environment. The program is funded through environmental fees charged on the sale of new paint in Alberta. The fees are put into a dedicated fund that can only be used to manage the paint recycling program.

The paint is sorted into different streams and sent to registered processors to be recycled into new paint, used in other products or in energy recovery, or sent for proper disposal if necessary. Any processor that receives paint must be registered with the Paint Recycling Program and meet all applicable environmental, transportation, health & safety, and local requirements.

Calibre Environmental LTD. located in Calgary, Alberta, became a key part in 2008 of the new Alberta Paint Stewardship program which significantly increased the recycling of unused latex paint from across the province of Alberta. Calibre Environmental Ltd. currently processes about 1.6 million kilograms of latex paint annually, which equates to the successful recycling of one million litres of quality latex paint per year.

=== United Kingdom ===
In the UK reusable leftover paint can be donated to Community RePaint, a national network of paint reuse schemes. The network comprises local schemes run by not-for-profit organisations, local authorities or waste management companies, in the Community RePaint network. The schemes collect surplus paint from trade sources i.e. painters, decorators, retailers, manufacturers, and/or leftover paint donated by householders at council household waste and recycling centres (also known as tips). The paint is then sorted by staff and volunteers before being redistributed to local charities, community groups, families and individuals in need. The Community RePaint network, is sponsored by Dulux (part of AkzoNobel), managed by an environmental consultancy, Resource Futures, and has been cited as an example of best practice for the management of surplus paint in a report by the European Commission and by DEFRA in Guidance on Applying the Waste Hierarchy.

=== United States ===
Concerns about the life cycle of paint have led to the creation of PaintCare, a non-profit 501(c)(3) organization established to represent paint manufacturers (paint producers) to plan and operate paint stewardship programs in the United States in those states that pass paint stewardship laws.

Paint stewardship law aims to enable the paint industry to implement a collection program that allows consumers to take their leftover, unwanted paint to a collection site to be collected and recycled. Legislation mandating the creation of the PaintCare program has been enacted in eight states since 2009: Oregon, California, Connecticut, Rhode Island, Vermont, Minnesota, Maine, and Colorado. Legislation has also been passed for the District of Columbia; PaintCare anticipates beginning the District's paint stewardship program in September 2016. PaintCare is responsible for promoting the reuse of post-consumer architectural paint (leftover paint) and providing for the collection, transport, and processing of this paint using the hierarchy of "reduce, reuse, recycle," and proper disposal. Most PaintCare locations are at paint retailers who volunteer to take back paint. These retailers take back paint during regular business hours, making paint recycling and disposal much more convenient for the public.

Paint is shipped to companies such as GDB International, American Paint Recyclers (Ohio), Metro Paint (Oregon), UCI Environmental (Nevada) and Kelly Moore, Visions Paint Recycling, Inc (California)& Williams Paint Recycling Company. In the Southern California area, Acrylatex Coatings & Recycling, Inc. accepts unused/unwanted latex paints for reprocessing into a viable resource of recycled paints in 20-standard colors. In the southeastern United States Atlanta Paint Disposal has a paint recycling program with drop off locations in Atlanta, Georgia. In the northeast The Paint Exchange, LLC recycles latex paint.

In the Mid-Atlantic (DELAWARE) RepaintUSA 302-377-7329 also recycles paint.

== See also ==
- Austin ReBlend
- Hazardous waste
- List of environmental issues
- Product stewardship
- Environmental impact of paint
