= Residential Lead-Based Paint Hazard Reduction Act =

1992 United States measure

The Residential Lead-Based Hazard Reduction Act of 1992, was a 1992 law passed by the US Congress that regulates the selling of houses with lead paint in the United States and educates consumers about the dangers of lead paint.

The Act was enacted as Title X of the Housing and Community Development Act.

== Background ==
In the past, lead was added to household paint to increase its drying speed and improve the durability and life of the finish. However, Lead is toxic and is a possible carcinogen.

In 1978, the U.S. Consumer Product Safety Commission banned the residential use of lead-based paint containing ≥0.06% lead (600 ppm).

In 2017, the U.S. Department of Housing and Urban Development estimated that approximately 35 percent of U.S. homes (37 million) still contain some lead-based paint, a decline from 1990 estimate of 64 million homes with lead paint.

== Policy ==
As per Section 1018 of the Act, sellers must comply with the following requirements before selling or leasing a house built before 1978, or a house that is known to contain lead:

- The buyer must receive a pamphlet that details information regarding lead paint and its potential hazards.
- If there is lead paint in the house, or if there is an apparent danger of lead poisoning from lead paint in the house, then that information must be disclosed to the buyer. If so, the seller is then required to provide to the buyer any previous documentation or reports on the condition of lead paint in the house.
- The buyer must be allowed ten days to request an evaluation of any lead paint in the house. This time limit may be altered upon agreement by both the buyer and seller.
- Every contract selling a house must include a Lead Warning Statement. The buyer is required to read the statement, and their signature on the contract is equivalent to an acknowledgment that they have read it, as well as an acknowledgment that (1) and (3) have been fulfilled.

Sellers who do not comply with the above criterion are subject to legal action, as well as fines for the breaking of rules and any damages experienced by buyers.

== Impact ==
The effects of the Residential Lead-Based Hazard Reduction Act are studied through observations of people's behavior when choosing a home. A study that analyzed the effectiveness of Section 1018 concluded the following:

- For every economic group, there were no major changes to the number of families in old versus new houses.
- When presented with information about lead paint, people were more likely to consider the risks of living in an old house. People were more likely to exhibit this behavior when the information was presented during transactions.
- People were more likely to have a house tested for lead before buying.
- Houses saw a decrease in incidents in which paint was found peeling or coming off the walls.
- Older homes were less likely to be owned by families with young children.
