= Lead abatement in the United States =

Lead blood levels in US children

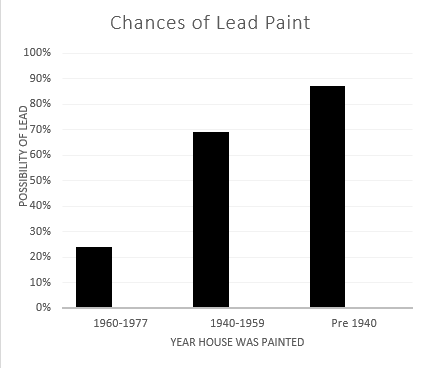
The chances of a house bought in the U.S. having lead, based on the year it was painted

Lead abatement is an activity to reduce levels of lead, particularly in the home environment, generally to permanently eliminate lead-based paint hazards, in order to reduce or eliminate incidents of lead poisoning.

Lead abatement may be undertaken in response to orders by state or local government. It requires specialized techniques that local construction contractors typically do not have. It includes activities such as lead-based paint inspections, risk assessments and lead-based paint removal.

In the United States, lead abatement activities are regulated by the United States Environmental Protection Agency (EPA). Individuals and firms that conduct lead-based paint activities, including abatement, must be certified.

Lead abatement is distinguished from Renovation, Repair and Painting (RRP) programs, which are typically performed at the option of the property owner for aesthetic or other reasons, or as an interim control to minimize lead hazards. RPP programs are not designed to permanently eliminate lead-based paint hazards.

== Options ==
Lead paint removal can cost 8 to 15 dollars per square foot. A kit offered by the EPA containing lead test costs 25 dollars. After a house has been discovered to contain lead, its owner has four options they can pursue to prevent lead poisoning: they can encapsulate it, enclose it, remove it or replace the contaminated items.

=== Encapsulation ===
Encapsulation is a low-cost and relatively simple strategy. A paint-like coating is brushed or rolled unto the lead surface to create a watertight bond that seals the lead. It is not the most permanent option, since normal wear and tear throughout the years will eventually weaken the coating.

=== Enclosure ===
The lead surface is covered with drywall, aluminum or vinyl cladding. Similar to encapsulation, it is considered to be relatively cheaper, but less reliable.

=== Removal ===
The lead can be removed with techniques such as wire brushing or wet hand scraping with liquid paint removers. Contractors may use an electric sander equipped with a high efficiency particulate air (HEPA) filtered vacuum or a heat gun. Burning, torching, and machine sanding without a HEPA attachment is forbidden. This option is the second most expensive, but has the advantage of being permanent.

=== Replacement ===
The most expensive option, since it calls for the entirety of whatever the lead paint is covering to be completely removed and disposed of.

== Costs ==
The savings from not needing to later clean up lead are much greater than the costs of not using lead. Peer reviewed research estimates a range of $17 to $221 saved for each dollar spent on lead hazard control. The benefits include reduced health care costs, extended lives (and earnings), increased tax revenue, reductions in crime, and more. The immense costs of inaction make lead hazard control highly economical. This is even more true in for the "lowest hanging fruit", like removing lead from all fuels including in lower income countries. The United Nations and the World Health Organization have been leading efforts to eliminate lead in paint since 2002.

== History ==
The reason that lead paint is such a common issue is because of its durability and widespread use. It was constantly endorsed by local and state governments until the 1970s, despite domestic occurrences of lead poisoning and reports from European countries that revealed its toxicity. By 1940, it was commonly associated with negative effects. It was not until the 1970s that the U.S. took action against lead-based paints.

Up to a few percent of lead is commonly added to brass to make it machine more easily; this reduces the clogging of cutting tools and allows the metal to be cut more quickly. Cutting tools smear lead across the surface; surface finishing may also have an effect. Lead also fill voids in castings; many plumbing fittings are cast, though some are wrought (formed hot without melting). Castings (such as many faucets) are often made from scrap metal, as this is cheaper; however, removing lead from the scrap can be expensive. Since lead does not dissolve in brass, as the alloy cools, it forms grains of brass; the lead is found in inclusions within the grains, but also along the grain boundaries, which form a network like that of a pile of soap bubbles (the grains being the spaces inside the bubbles). There may thus be significant lead leaching from alloys which seem to have quite a low lead content.

=== Timeline ===
Year	Event
1887	US medical authorities diagnose childhood lead poisoning.
1904	Child lead poisoning linked to lead-based paints.
1909	France, Belgium and Austria ban white-lead interior paint.
1914	Pediatric lead-paint poisoning death from eating crib paint is described.
1921	Tetraethyllead is first used in gasoline.
1921	National Lead Company admits lead is a poison.
1922	League of Nations bans white-lead interior paint; US declines to adopt.
1943	Report concludes eating lead paint chips causes physical and neurological disorders, behavior, learning and intelligence problems in children.
1951	Baltimore banned the use of lead pigment in interior paint in Baltimore housing, the first such restriction in the country.
1955	Public health officials and organizations adopted a voluntary national standard to prohibit, in effect, the use of lead pigments in interior residential paints.
1971	Lead-Based Paint Poisoning Prevention Act passed.
1976	Phase-out of tetraethyllead in gasoline began
1978	Lead-based house paint banned by the Consumer Product Safety Commission
1986	Amendments to the Safe Drinking Water Act require new drinking-water waterpipes, solder, and flux to be "lead-free"; however, this is defined as less than 8% lead in pipes, and 0.2% in solder and flux. It is possible to make plumbing fittings from metal that literally does not contain any lead.
1996	Nationwide ban on leaded gasoline finalized. New plumbing fittings (valves, joints, etc) and fixtures (faucets, for instance) were now also required to contain less than 8% lead.
1999	The State of California asked key-makers to voluntarily reduce the amount of lead used in unplated brass keys, after tests found that handling the average brass key twice a day would cause exposure of 19 times the exposure limits. Plated keys were unaffected.
2014	In 2014 the drinking-water plumbing rule was changed; new plumbing now had to weighted average of ≤0.25% lead on the wetted surfaces (meaning that each area of pure lead would, in theory, be counterbalanced by 400× that area of lead-free metal surface). Exceptions apply for water used for irrigating crops, watering gardens, and large valves used in the water distribution system. This standard was criticized, as it did not measure leaching: faucets made to the new standard sometimes leached more lead than those that met the old standard.

=== Recent issues ===
==== Flint Water Crisis ====
Flint, Michigan has become relatively infamous because of the Flint Water Crisis caused by its lead-contaminated drinking water, first reported in 2015, and still reported as ongoing in 2020. Poorly treated water and decaying pipes caused lead levels to rise significantly and become extremely dangerous if ingested. Other cities are suspected of having contaminated water following an analysis of EPA records by the Natural Resources Defense Council (NRDC). It has been estimated that in 2015 over 18 million people had been served by 5,363 community water systems that did not comply with EPA's Lead and Copper Rule.

==== Other ====
An additional 33 cities around the US have been investigated for violating EPA guidance when it comes to properly testing their water systems for lead contamination. The results of analyzing documents found some that correspond to the recent water testing operations in these cities, and show that in 23 cities testers or members of the public were instructed to run water slowly, which reduces the amount of lead dislodged from the pipes. In seven cities testers or members of the public were instructed to remove aerators (which reduces lead content) before opening water taps and drawing samples. In 21 cities testers or members of the public were instructed to "pre-flush" before testing done by EPA, which influences the amount of lead the EPA can detect.

A typical water utility action is to adjust the chemistry of the drinking water with anti-corrosive additives, but replacement of lead service lines (pipes that connect water mains to customers) is also an option. Most communities have avoided lead service line replacement due to the high cost.

It has been estimated that removing the large, common lead hazards in the US would cost $400 billion over a 10-year period, but save $84bn just for children born in 2018. There have been some successful lawsuits against the manufacturers of lead-including products for damages from lead poisoning, similar to earlier lawsuits against tobacco companies.

Less than 20% of American children are thought to be tested for lead levels, although some standards call for all children to be screened at ages 1 and 2. There is a lack of systematic screening. The Flint water crisis was detected by other means; there is no robust surveillance system for detecting such emergencies.

Children in poorer and racialized communities are exposed to more lead, due to historic discriminatory policies, as are children on water from private wells, which is often not tested.
