= Lead abatement =

Reduction of lead, particularly in homes

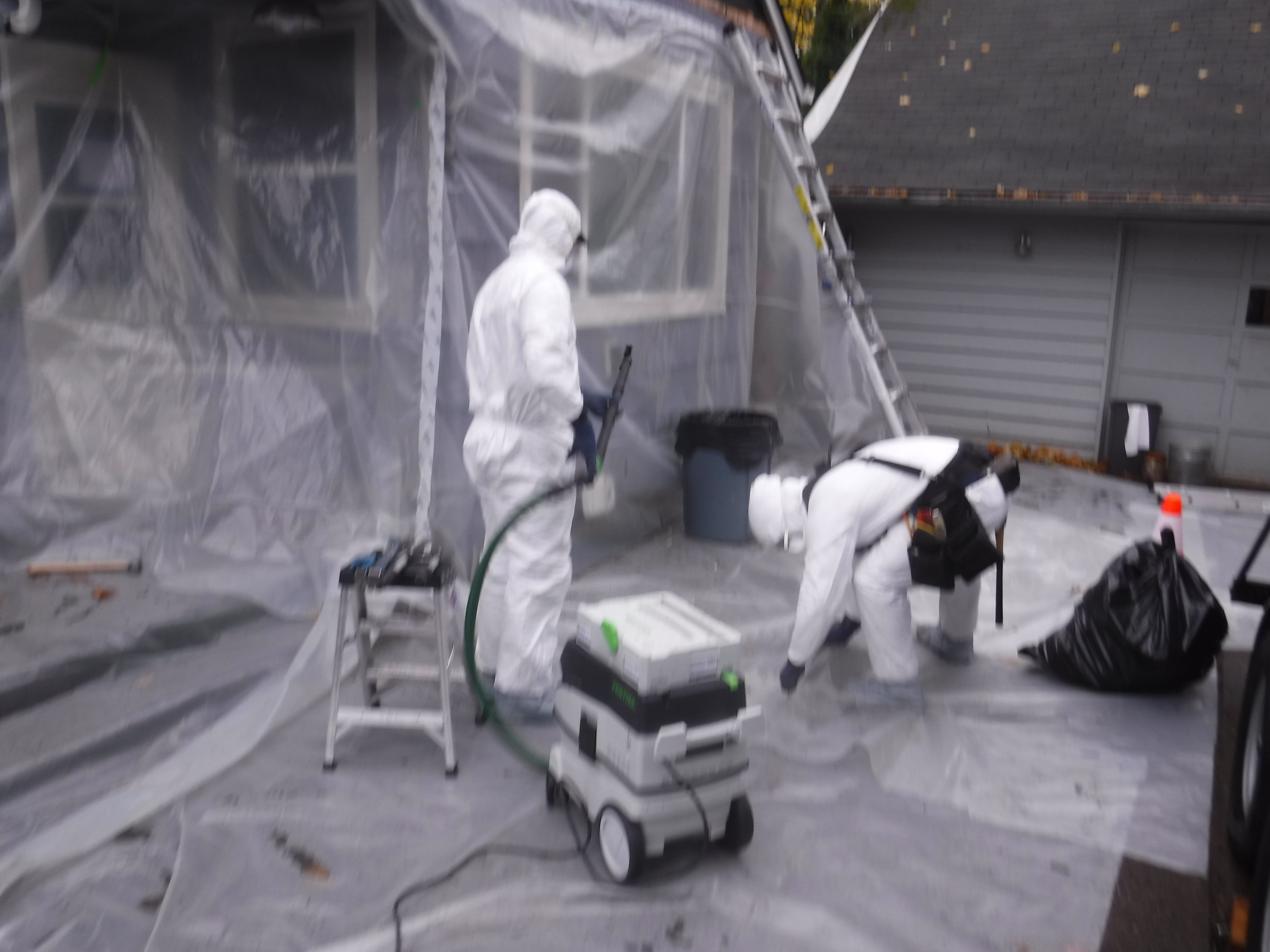
Lead paint abatement

Lead abatement includes lead-based paint abatement activities, such as inspections, risk assessments, as well as removal. Lead abatement must be performed by educated, certified professionals with proper safety protocols to limit lead exposure. The goal is to permanently eliminate lead-based paint hazards, such as serious permanent and irreversible health damage due to lead poisoning in children. This is especially important in home environments and in any facility with frequent visitation by children, particularly those built before 1978.

== Techniques ==
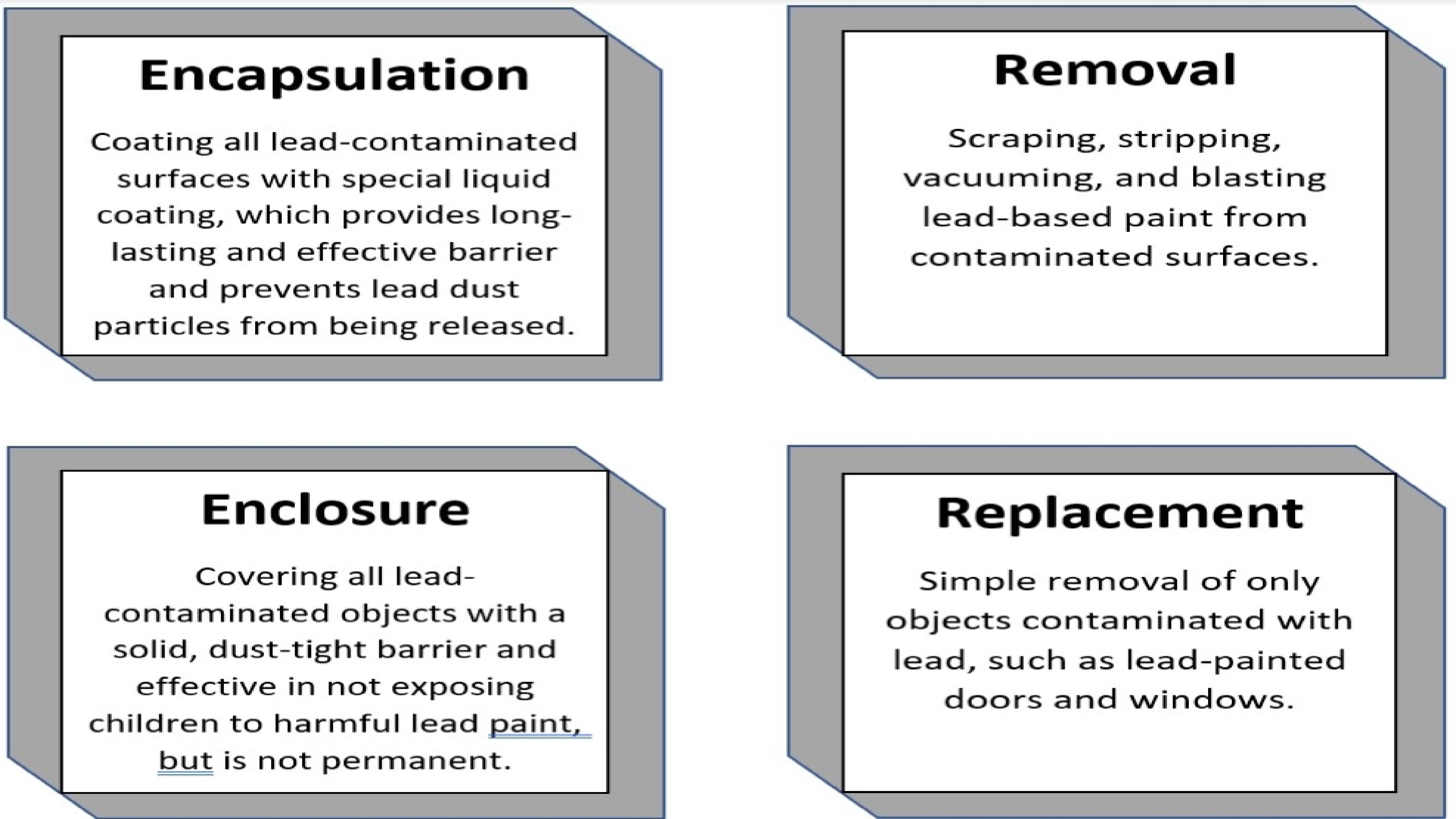
This diagram describes the different residential lead-based paint removal techniques, performed by licensed lead abatement professionals.

=== Residential ===
There are various lead abatement techniques to remove residential lead-based paint and lead in household dusts. Encapsulation and enclosure makes the hazard of lead-based paint inaccessible, while chemical stripping, removal of abrasives, scraping with the hand, and component replacement are effective in permanently removing lead-based paints from households. Encapsulation refers to the technique that coats all lead-contaminated surfaces with a special liquid coating, which provides a long-lasting and effective barrier and prevents lead dust particles from being released. Enclosure refers to covering all lead-contaminated surfaces and objects with a solid, dust-tight barrier, which is effective in not exposing children to harmful lead paint but is not a permanent solution. Removal is the act of scraping, stripping, vacuuming, and blasting lead-based paint from contaminated surfaces. Replacement is the simple removal and substitution of only objects contaminated with lead, such as lead-painted doors and windows. However, residential lead abatement practices are relatively expensive, and some practices are ineffective and could even worsen the current situation.

=== Soils ===
Lead contaminated soil is one of the leading sources of lead poisoning for children in the United States. Soils with lead are especially prominent in urban landscapes and near old homes and child-occupied facilities that were built before 1978 (also known as target housing). Lead can get into soils via deposits from leaded gasoline (which was banned in the United States in 1996 by the Clean Air Act), degradation of leaded paint on nearby paint surfaces, exterior lead-based paint chippings and dust, and industrial sites. It is important that lead contaminated soils be properly disposed as soon as possible. For risk assessment, it is recommended by the US EPA that more than two dust and soil samples are taken. Remediation technologies and methods for lead contaminated soils include excavation and off-site disposal to permanently remove the contaminated soils from the site, containment technologies (such as asphalt capping) to reduce human health exposure and hazards, and traditional techniques (such as washing and stabilizing soil). In addition, it is important that there is a comprehensive nationwide understanding by the people of the hazards and proper removal of lead contaminated soils. Specific, official guidelines for removal or covering of lead-contaminated soil can be found in the US EPA guidance issues in 1994, also known as the Section 403 Guidance.

== Lead abatement vs. RRP ==
Lead abatement and RRP (Renovation, Repair, and Painting) activities are similar in that they are both performed in target housing and child-occupied facilities. In the United States, they are both protected under OSHA 29 CFR 1926.62 and required to post signage in lead-related work areas.

However, even though the activities performed look similar, lead abatement and RRP activities are also very different. Lead abatement is a specialized activity that is performed to permanently eliminate lead-based paint hazards and is usually done based on orders from state or local governments after a serious lead-related incident. Meanwhile, RRP activities are only performed at the discretion and desire of the home or facility owner to temporarily minimize lead-related hazards for aesthetic or lead-unrelated purposes. Lead abatement techniques include encapsulation, enclosure, removal, and/or replacement, while RRP activities include modification or repair of painted doors, surface restoration, window repair, surface preparation that usually produces paint dust, removal of painted building components, cutting holes in painted surfaces to install insulation, and installation of interim controls that disturb existing painted surfaces. Thus, RRP activities are more high risk than lead abatement techniques because they can further disturb the existing lead paint and institute more problems.

== Rules and regulations in the United States ==
Lead abatement, also known as lead-based paint activities, are regulated by the United States Environmental Protection Agency (EPA). Laws and policies involving lead abatement activities are enforced and kept in check by the EPA, local government, and state government. All lead-based paint activities intended by state governments and facility owners must receive proper authorization from the EPA before being carried out. Because working with lead poses health risks and even permanent damage to health, it is important that lead abatement workers, supervisors, inspectors, and other individuals dealing with lead-based paint strictly comply to the following regulations. Individuals performing lead abatement activities in the home environment or child-occupied facilities must be properly trained, take classes, and get certified; training programs providing instruction in such activities must be accredited and approved by the EPA; and these activities must be carried out in accordance to reliable, effective, and safe work practice standards, as defined by OSHA. Improper lead abatement or removal by the incorrect method or by an unlicensed individual can result in severe consequences. If lead abatement is improperly managed or carried out, chips and dust can pose additional health hazards. Furthermore, the current situation can worsen as well. To prevent this, Congress passed the 1992 Residential Lead Based Paint Hazard Reduction Act of 1992, which ensures that contractors are well qualified and properly trained.

== Lead-based paints ==
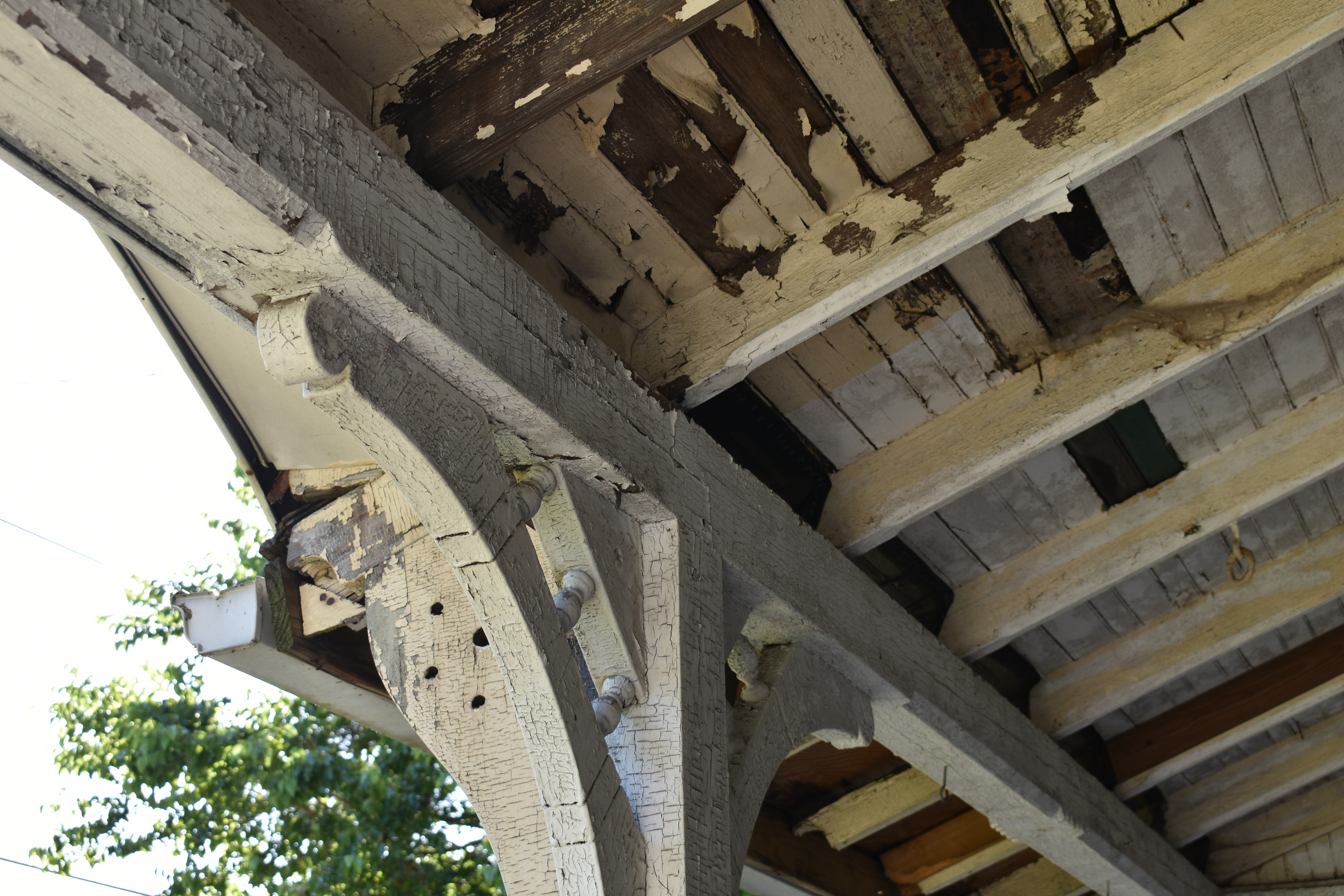
Lead paint can crack and form flakes, which then contaminate the surrounding environment.

The production and consumption of lead-based paints is a worldwide issue. Many Asian countries, especially China, depend on the import, export, production, and consumption of paints. However, the paints produced in China and other Asian countries are problematic. Paints used for toys, paint to make finger paint, interior and exterior wall paint, and woodenware paints are all the types of paints produced in Asian countries, particularly China. Many paints contain much more lead content than regulatory standards allow. The regulatory standards can be misleading as well. For example, in China, the safe lead content criteria is based on soluble lead levels, not total lead levels; this can lead to paints being labeled as safe even when they contain harmful concentrations of lead. It was also found in a study that colored paints have more lead concentrations than pure white paints, most likely due to lead being added for additional color enhancement. As such, even with regulatory standards for lead content in paints, there are still paints with lead being produced around the world. It has been observed that paints produced in third world, developing countries contain higher lead content than those produced in first world, developed countries. The production and consumption of lead-based paints is actually growing in developing countries. In these developing countries, many of which do not have the proper resources, personnel, technology, and tools to remove lead from their paints. Thus, many lead-related illnesses and defects, especially in children, are arising in these countries. In order to prevent the detrimental effects of the production and consumption of lead-based paints, the United Nations Environment Program (UNEP) has initiated the Global Alliance to Eliminate Lead Paint to prevent exposure to lead through advocating the phase-out of paints containing lead. Through these kinds of programs, it is important that all countries worldwide understand what lead-based paints are, what the effects and risks of lead-based paints are, what alternatives to lead-based paints there are, and what the proper removal methods and strategies are. Verification of all paint content labels, correct adjustment of regulatory standards and criteria for safe lead content in paints, and awareness and education are crucial in abating lead-based paint and its harmful effects around the world.

== See also ==
- Environmental toxicology
- History of the tetraethyllead controversy
- Lead and crime hypothesis
- Organolead chemistry
- Pollution control
- Lead abatement in the United States
