= Environmental impact of paint =

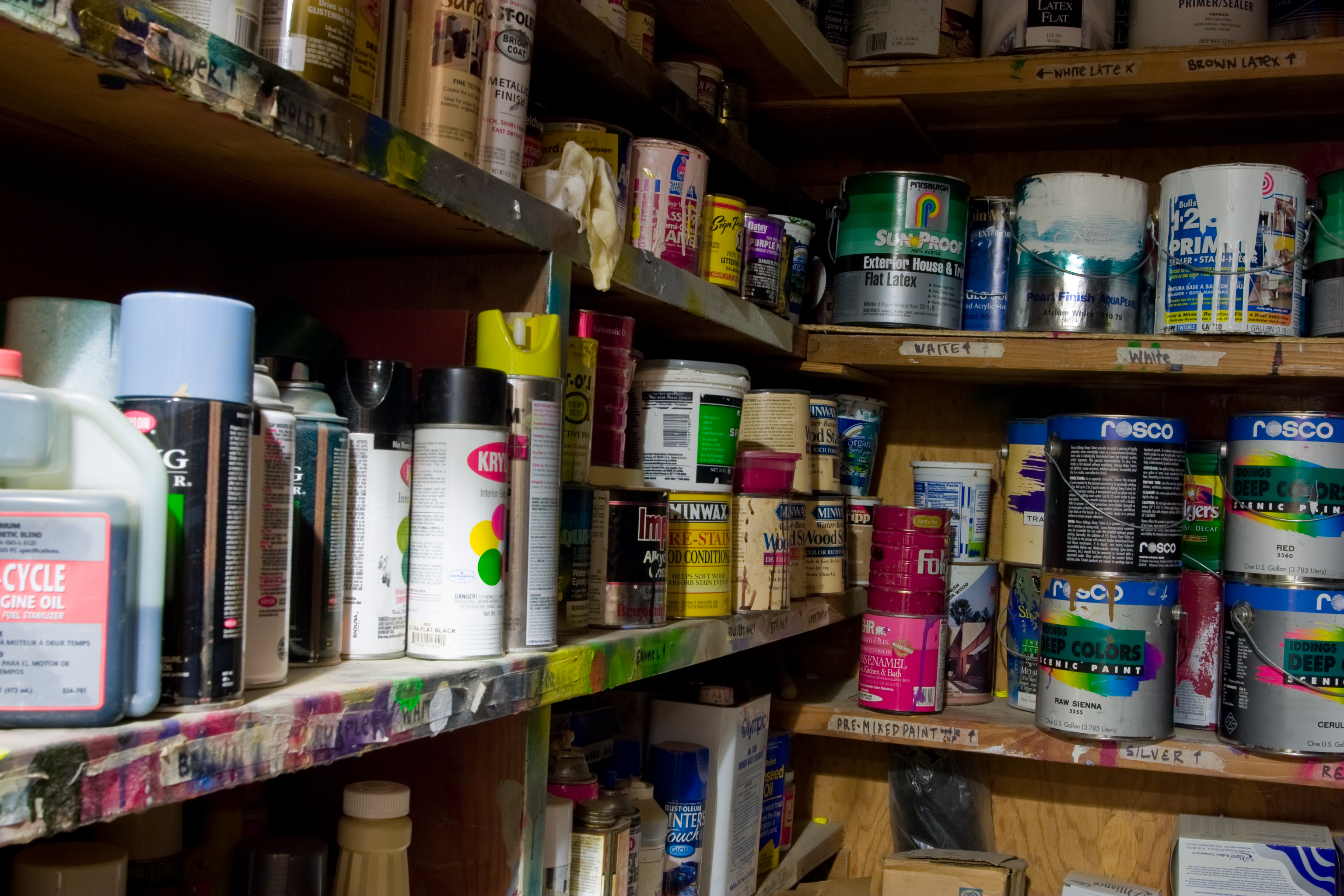
An assortment of paints

The environmental impact of paint can vary depending on the type of paint used and mitigation measures. Traditional painting materials and processes can have harmful effects on the environment, including those from the use of lead and other additives. Measures can be taken to reduce its environmental effects, including accurately estimating paint quantities so waste is minimized, and use of environmentally preferred paints, coating, painting accessories, and techniques.

The United States Environmental Protection Agency guidelines and Green Star standards can be applied.

== Issues ==
=== Low-VOC and other environmentally preferred paints ===
Volatile organic compounds (VOCs) are gases emitted by various solids or liquids, many of which have short- and long-term adverse health effects. Solvents in traditional paints often contain high quantities of VOCs. The beneficial characteristics of low-VOC paints is to improve indoor air quality through little or no odor, less pollution, safer technology, as well as excellent durability and a washable finish. Low-VOC paint types include latex (water-based), acrylic, and milk paint, with most relatively easy to recycle.

The labels of paint cans can be checked for the following information:

- To be considered low-VOC, the paint should contain <50 g/L of VOC.
- To be considered zero-VOC, the paint should contain <5 g/L of VOC.
- Solid content usually ranges 25–45%; higher solid percentages indicate less VOCs.

In the US, items containing toxic ingredients have registration numbers with either the:

1. US Environmental Protection Agency (EPA)
2. Occupational Safety and Health Administration (OSHA)
3. United States Department of Transportation (DOT)

=== Anti-fouling paint ===
Antifouling paint (or bottom paint) is used to protect the hulls of boats from fouling by marine organisms. Antifouling paint protects the surface from corrosion and prevents drag on the ship from any build-up of marine organisms. These paints have contained organotin compounds such as tributyltin, which are considered to be toxic chemicals with negative effects on humans and the environment. Tributyltin compounds are moderately to highly persistent organic pollutants that bioconcentrate up the marine predators' food chain. One common example is it leaching from marine paints into the aquatic environment, causing irreversible damage to the aquatic life. Tributyltin has also been linked to obesity in humans, as it triggers genes that cause the growth of fat cells.

Tributyltin is harmful to some marine organisms, including the dog whelk, it causes dog whelks to suffer from imposex; females develop male sexual characteristics such as a penis. This causes them to become infertile or even die. In severe cases, males can develop egg sacs.

Alternatives include biomimetic antifouling coatings.

=== Heavy metals ===
Heavy metals are used in paints and have raised concerns due to their toxicity at high levels of exposure and since they build up in the food chain.

Lead

Lead paint contains lead as pigment. Lead is also added to paint to speed drying, increase durability, retain a fresh appearance, and resist moisture that causes corrosion. Although banned in many countries, paint with significant lead content is still used in areas such as Eastern Europe and Asia, most commonly for industry purposes like anti-corrosive paint. For example, leaded paint is sometimes used to paint roadways and parking lot lines. Lead, a poisonous metal, can damage nerve connections (especially in young children) and cause blood and brain disorders. Because of lead's low reactivity and solubility, lead poisoning usually only occurs in cases when it is dispersed, such as when sanding lead-based paint prior to repainting.

Chromium

Primer paint containing hexavalent chromium is still widely used for aerospace and automobile refinishing applications. Zinc chromate has been used as a pigment for artists' paint, known as zinc yellow or yellow 36. It is highly toxic and now rarely used.

== Types of Pollution ==
Production of gas leads to three main forms of pollution and waste: solid, liquid and gas.

=== Liquid ===
The process of creating paint consumes a large amount of water and chemicals which leads to the production of large amounts of wastewater. Roughly 70% of the wastewater produced by the paint manufacturing industry is released into natural bodies of water which causes the destination to be polluted. The industry generates between 75 and 85 million gallons of wastewater per day. The wastewater generated during production has high levels of chemical oxygen demand (COD) because of all the substances used in the creation process.

=== Solid ===
The paint manufacturing process produces solid waste. Most of the solid waste generated is formed in the dispersion, filing, and fluid transport stages of paint production. Examples of solid waste that is formed during production include adhesives, plastic, and resins.

=== Gas ===
Hazardous gases are released during the creation and use of paint and can be harmful to people.

Total suspended particulate matter (TSPM or TSP) is one of these pollutants. The World Health Organization has determined that exposure to total suspended particulate matter can lead to acute respiratory infection, asthma, emphysema, lung cancer, cardiovascular disease, and chronic obstructive lung disease to people working with it.

The volatile organic compounds emitted can potentially turn into hazardous air pollutants. VOCs can cause people to experience eye irritation, breathing difficulties, kidney damage, and cancer. VOCs can negatively affect the environment by polluting groundwater and drinking water.

== Mitigation ==
As a response to the environmental and health concerns, some paint manufacturers now offer environmentally friendly alternatives. Also, in some countries, paint recycling is carried out on surplus paints and resold.

Paint and coating manufacturers can modify their operations to reduce and mitigate air pollution. The first step manufacturers can take to reduce air pollution is to eliminate the use of heavy metals in coating mixtures and reformulate coatings to be non-hazardous. In place of heavy metals, non-hazardous biocides can be used to kill bacteria. Manufacturers can also reduce emissions during the creation process by covering materials and tanks to reduce spills and leakage during the blending, mixing, and packaging of the paint. Paint manufacturers can also start recycling paint; recycling paint allows new paint to be created with less emission.

== See also ==
- List of environmental issues
- Lead-based paint in the United Kingdom
- Lead-based paint in the United States
