= Standard Industries =

American industrial company

Standard Industries Holdings Inc.
- Type: Private
- Industry: Conglomerate
- Headquarters: New York City, U.S.
- Area served: Worldwide
- Key people: David Winter (CEO)
- Products: building materials shingles roofing systems solar roofing systems waterproofing systems specialty chemicals specialty granules
- Number of employees: 20,000+ (2025)
- Subsidiaries: GAF; BMI Group; Siplast; SGI; Schiedel; Standard Logistics; W. R. Grace and Company
- Website: standardindustries.com

Standard Industries is an American privately-held global industrial conglomerate headquartered in New York City. Standard is the parent company of a number of industrial manufacturers. Standard also has related real estate and investment platforms. David Winter is the CEO of the company. David Winter is also CEO of Standard Investments.

Standard's operating companies include GAF, W. R. Grace and Company, BMI Group, Siplast, Schiedel, Specialty Granules (SGI), and Standard Logistics.

== History ==
Standard Industries' origins date back to 1886, with the founding of the Standard Paint Company, which later changed its name to The Ruberoid Co. and then merged with General Aniline & Film, adopting the GAF name.

In 2007, GAF acquired ElkCorp, a leading residential roofing manufacturer.

In January 2016, Standard purchased the Danish company Icopal for about €1 billion. In April 2017, the company acquired the German Braas Monier Building Group for €1.1 billion and formed BMI Group with its merger of Brass Monier and Icopal. In 2016, Specialty Granules (SGI), a North American aggregates and mining company, also became a Standard Industries operating company.

In January 2019, Standard launched GAF Energy, a solar company which aims to increase the installations of residential solar roofs by working with regional installers.

In September 2021, Standard Industries Holdings acquired Grace in an all-cash transaction of $70 per share, valued at approximately $7 billion.

== Operations ==
Standard Industries is led by CEO David Winter. The company has more than 20,000 employees in approximately 50 countries.

=== Operating companies ===
GAF is the largest roofing company in North America which focuses on the manufacturing of roofing and waterproofing materials. Its projects include the Library of Congress and the Alamo. GAF Energy is a manufacturer of residential solar roofs. It is the solar roofing business unit of GAF. Siplast is a manufacturer of roofing and waterproofing systems.

BMI is a manufacturer of building materials and roofing accessories. It was formed in 2016 in the merger of Brass Monier and Icopal. BMI's projects include the Louvre, the Maria Taferl, and the Lego House in Denmark.

Schiedel is a designer and manufacturer of chimney, stove, and ventilation systems in Europe.

Specialty Granules (SGI) is a North American aggregates and mining company.

In September 2021, Standard acquired W. R. Grace & Co., an American specialty chemicals business headquartered in Columbia, Maryland for approximately $7 billion.

== Related businesses ==
=== Standard Investments ===
Standard's related investment business, Standard Investments, is a fundamentally-based investment platform that takes concentrated long-term positions across a range of sectors and leverages industrial knowledge to create value for stakeholders. It is active in public equities, real estate, and venture capital.

In July 2020, Standard Investments' venture capital firm (formerly 40 North Ventures) acquired investments in eleven of GE Ventures' startups in industrial and technological sectors.

=== Winter Properties ===
Winter Properties is a related business of Standard Industries that owns multiple properties in New York City and nationally. Winter Properties' holdings are a mix of commercial and residential properties.
