= Thomas Roche =

Thomas Roche may refer to:

- Thomas C. Roche, American war photographer
- Thomas de la Roche, 1st Baron Roche, English noble
- Tommy Roche, Irish rugby player
