= Ansco =

American photographic company

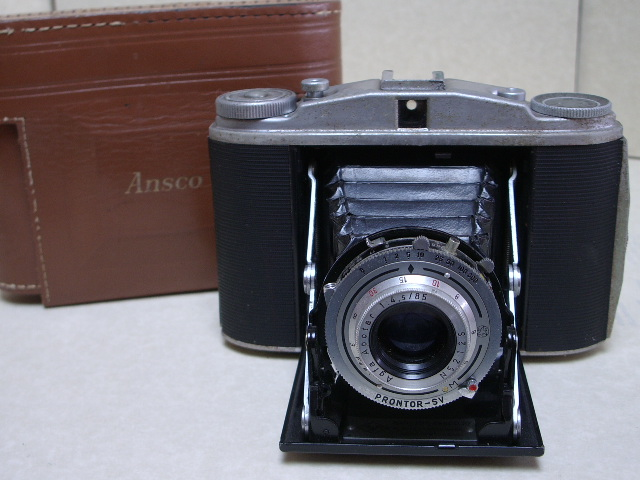
- Type: Camera, film and lens manufacturer
- Industry: photography
- Founded: 1842 as E. Anthony & Co. by Edward Anthony; 1901 as Ansco Co.; in 1928 as Agfa Ansco Co.
- Headquarters: Binghamton, New York, USA
- Products: Cameras, Films, Optical and other products
- Parent: American IG

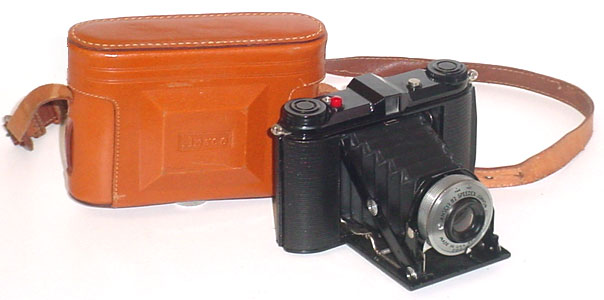
An Ansco B2 Speedex Junior

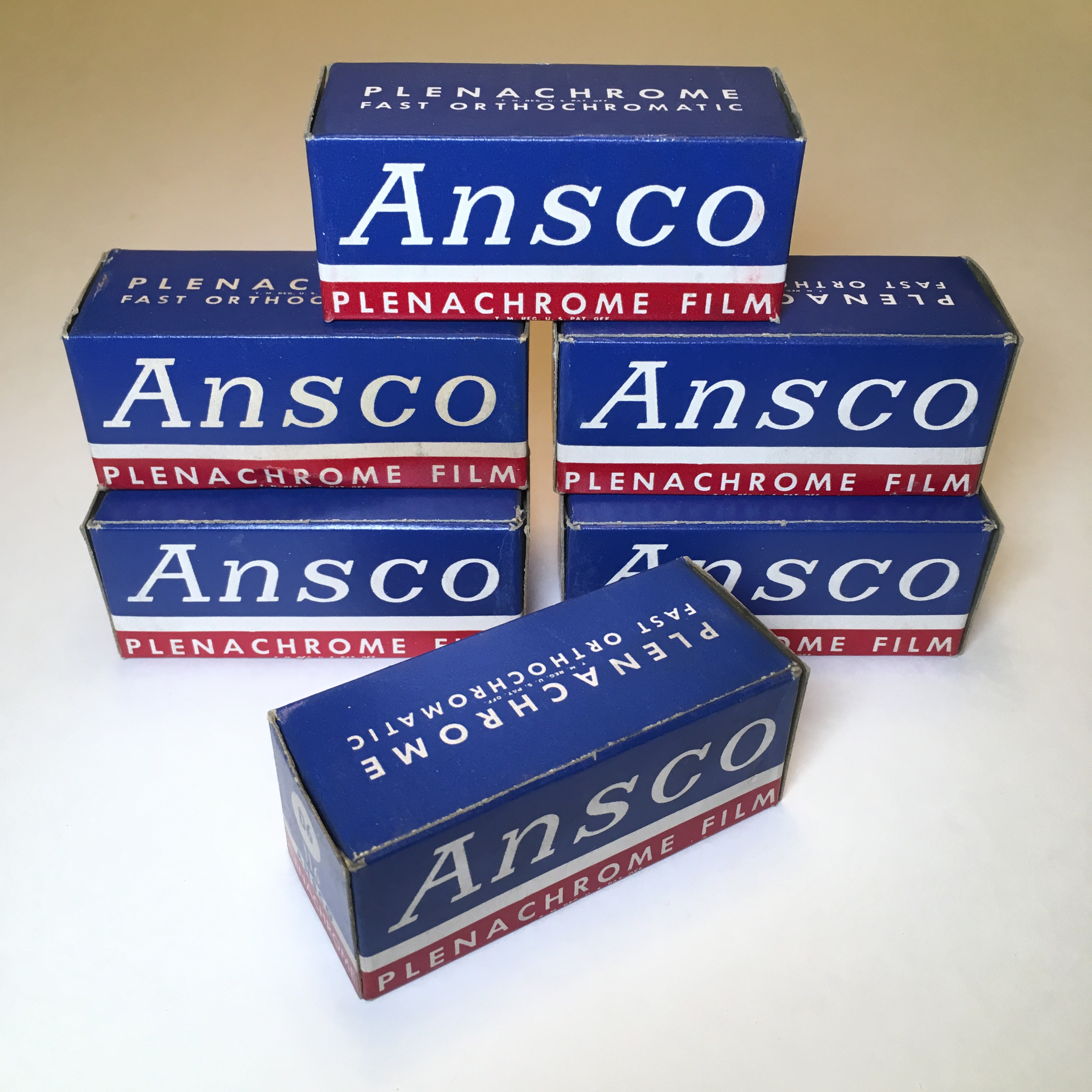
Ansco Plenachrome 116 Film (Expired: July 1948)

Ansco was the brand name of a photographic company based in Binghamton, New York, which produced photographic films, papers and cameras from the mid-19th century until the 1980s.

The company was founded in 1842 by Edward Anthony. In the 1880s, Anthony and Scovill, as the company had become known, bought the Goodwin Camera & Film Company, whose founder Hannibal Goodwin invented flexible photographic film. In 1928 Agfa of Germany merged with Ansco and allowed it to compete in the worldwide photographic market like its competitors, Kodak and Zeiss. This joint company added many Agfa cameras and accessories to its sales in the USA as a result. In the months after the bombing of Pearl Harbor, the US Government seized Agfa-Ansco. This now government-run business continued to survive as a hostile alien property (under government control into the 1960s). During this period, the organization was renamed GAF (General Aniline & Film Corporation). Throughout the postwar period the concern sold rebadged versions of cameras made by other manufacturers, including Agfa and Chinon. A Minolta-built Ansco model was the first 35 mm camera in outer space, and their film was used in space, too.

== History ==
=== Early history ===
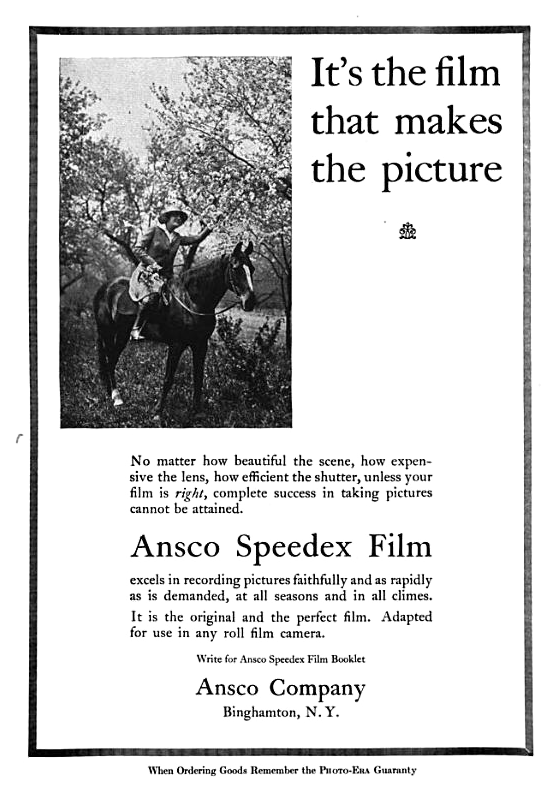
Advertisement for Ansco Speedex Film, 1920.

The company was founded in 1842 (pre-dating Kodak in the photography business) as E. Anthony & Co. (later E. and H. T. Anthony & Company, when Edward Anthony's brother officially joined the business) and became the Anthony & Scovill Co. in 1901, after a merger with the camera business of Scovill Manufacturing (Connecticut), founded by James Mitchell Lamson Scovill and William Henry Scovill. That year the company headquarters relocated to Binghamton, New York. This was already a site of one of Ansco's photographic paper manufacturing facilities. Just after that, in 1905 it settled a landmark patent infringement case against Eastman Kodak, which had been violating the Goodwin flexible film patent (Hannibal Goodwin of Newark, New Jersey) held by Ansco. The settlement received from Eastman Kodak was very small compared to the damage done to Ansco, which already had financial problems as a result of business lost to Eastman Kodak.

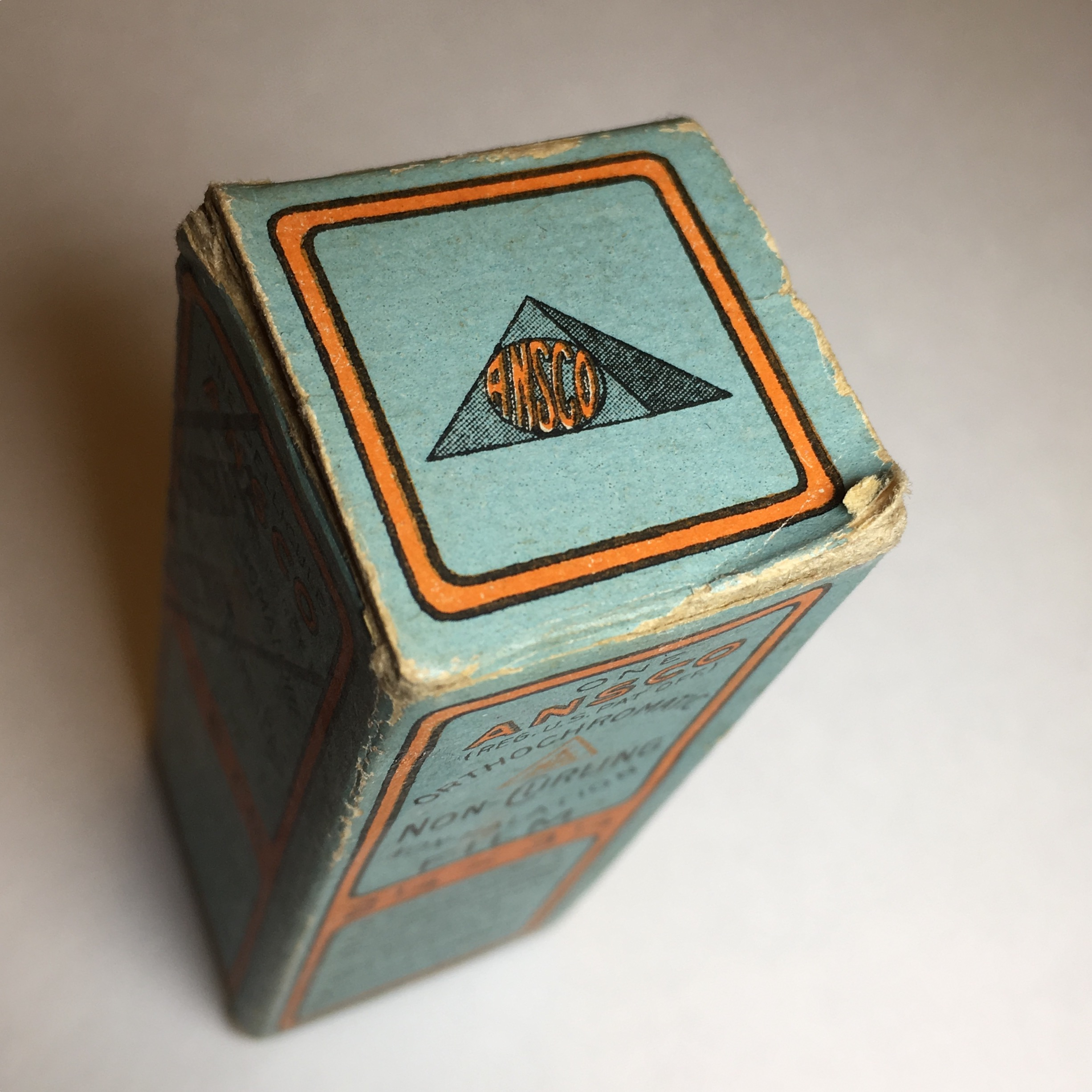
Early Ansco Logo on a 120 roll film that expired in 1916

=== Merger with Agfa ===
In 1928 Ansco merged with the German photo company Agfa to form a corporation named Agfa-Ansco. Later that year that firm and other German-owned chemical firms were merged into a Swiss holding company, Internationale Gesellschaft für Chemische Unternehmungen AG or IG Chemie, that was controlled by Germany's chemical industry conglomerate, IG Farben. In 1929 the parent corporation's name was changed to American IG Chemical Corporation or American IG, later renamed General Aniline & Film, which continued to produce cameras under the Agfa-Ansco name.

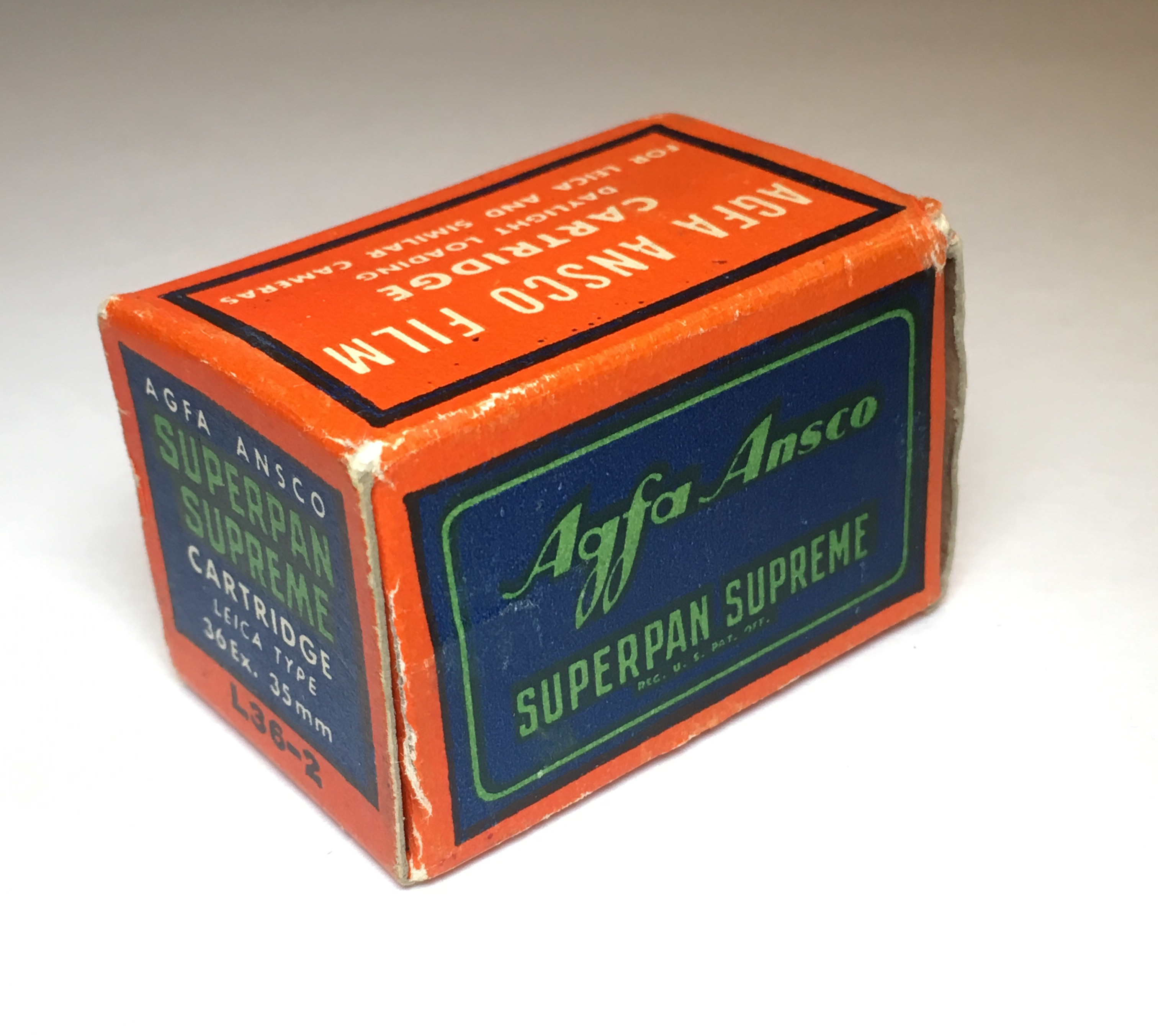
Agfa Ansco 35mm Film (Expired: April 1945)

During the period before the U. S. entrance into World War II, the Agfa-Ansco business grew enormously, with added manufacturing capacity in paper, film and camera manufacturing. The company purchased a new factory building in Binghamton, which would remain its main production facility until 1977. The Agfa-Ansco interests in the U. S. and Binghamton factory were taken over by the U. S. government in 1941 due to its ties with Germany. The Ansco company was merged with General Aniline as General Aniline & Film in 1939.

=== Color film: Anscochrome ===
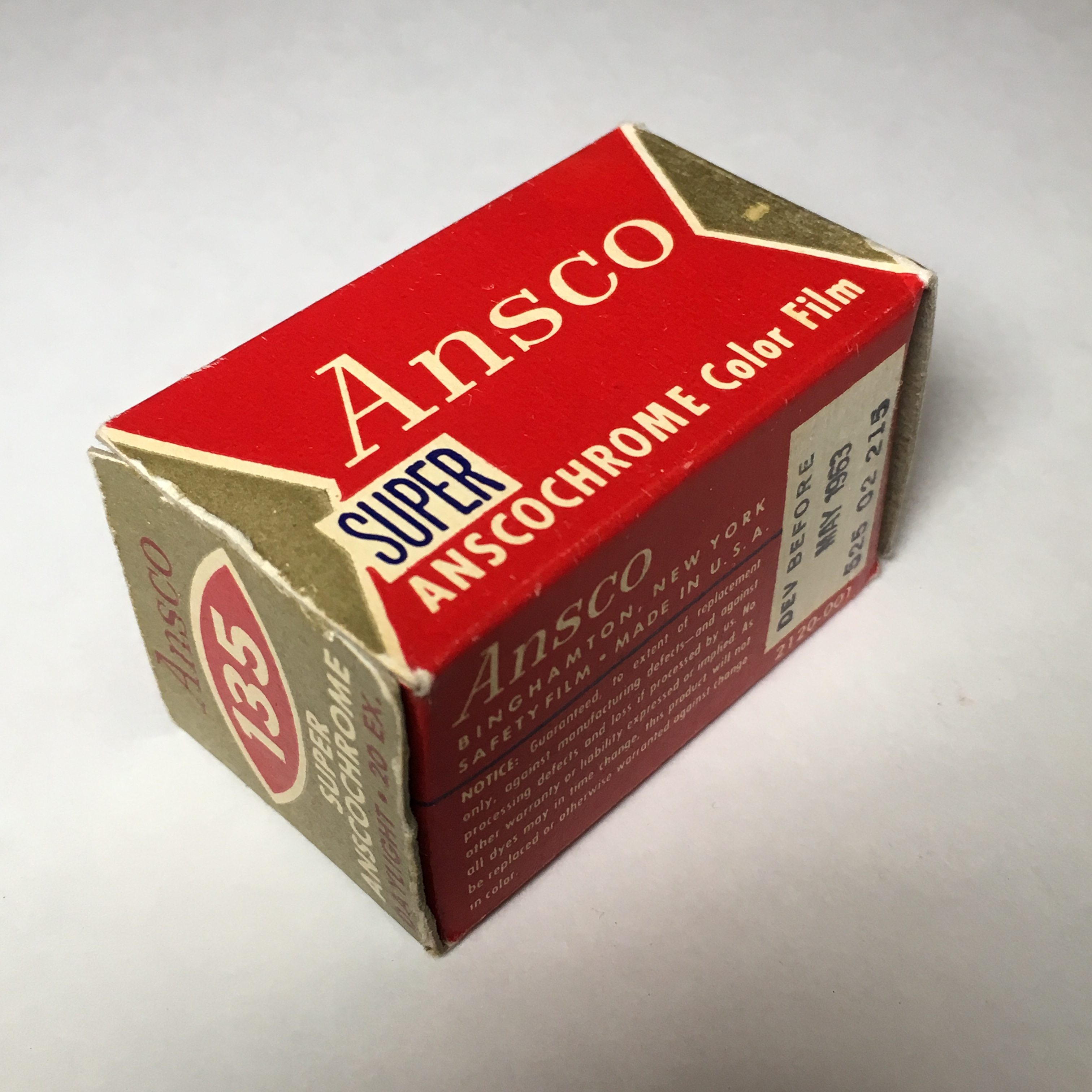
Box of 35mm Ansco Super Anscochrome color slide film (Expired: May 1963)

Prior to the war, Agfa-Ansco had marketed Agfacolor film made in Germany. To assist the war effort, the company experts used available information to develop a similar product, first called Ansco Color, later Anscochrome. After the war, Anscochrome was widely distributed, but met with limited commercial success in competition with Kodak products. An important marketing feature was its greater speed in comparison to Kodachrome. A second advantage was that users, professional or amateur, could process the film in their own darkrooms rather than having to send it away (as with Kodachrome) albeit still needing to use cumbersome re-exposure steps like with early Kodak Ektachrome.

=== Post-war business ===
The company was the last business to be sold as enemy assets to American interests in the 1960s. At that time, a new headquarters was constructed in Vestal, New York, adjacent to the new college campus of Harpur College (now Binghamton University). This location the one of two remaining pieces of Ansco in the Binghamton area and is currently occupied by the University. The factory building at 16 Emma Street in Binghamton is currently luxury apartments. The Vestal location continued to do business as Ansco until 1967 when the company adopted the parent's name of General Aniline & Film (GAF), and a variety of cameras as well as films were sold under this name until the business was shut down in the early 1980s. Briefly in the 1970s, it was the official film of Disneyland and at this time, actor Henry Fonda served as the company's spokesman in television commercials including one that featured Jodie Foster in her first acting role. The last Ansco cameras were produced in the early 1990s by a Hong Kong business that bought the rights to the name.

== Gallery ==
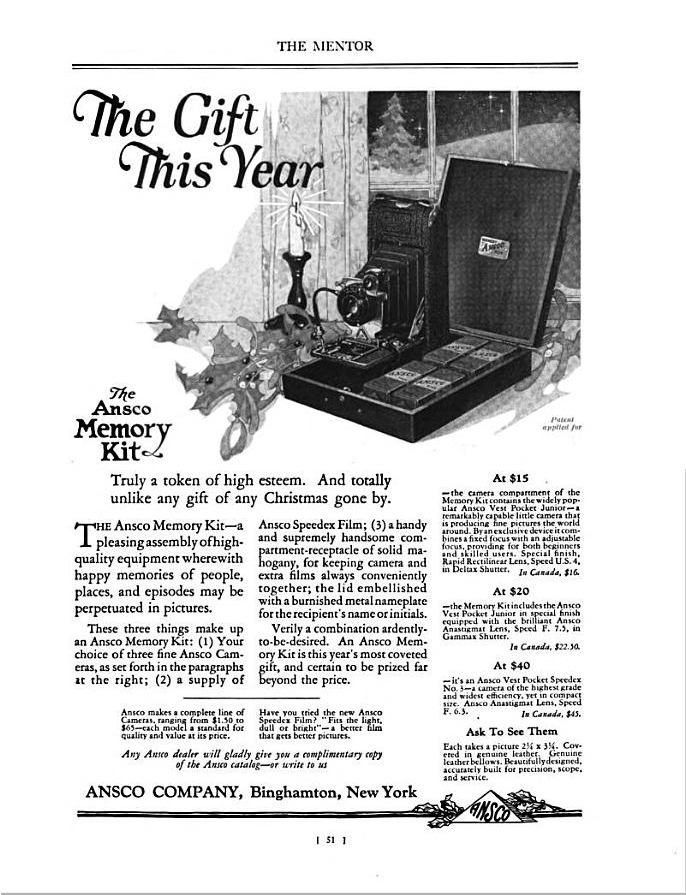
Advertisement for Ansco cameras, 1922.

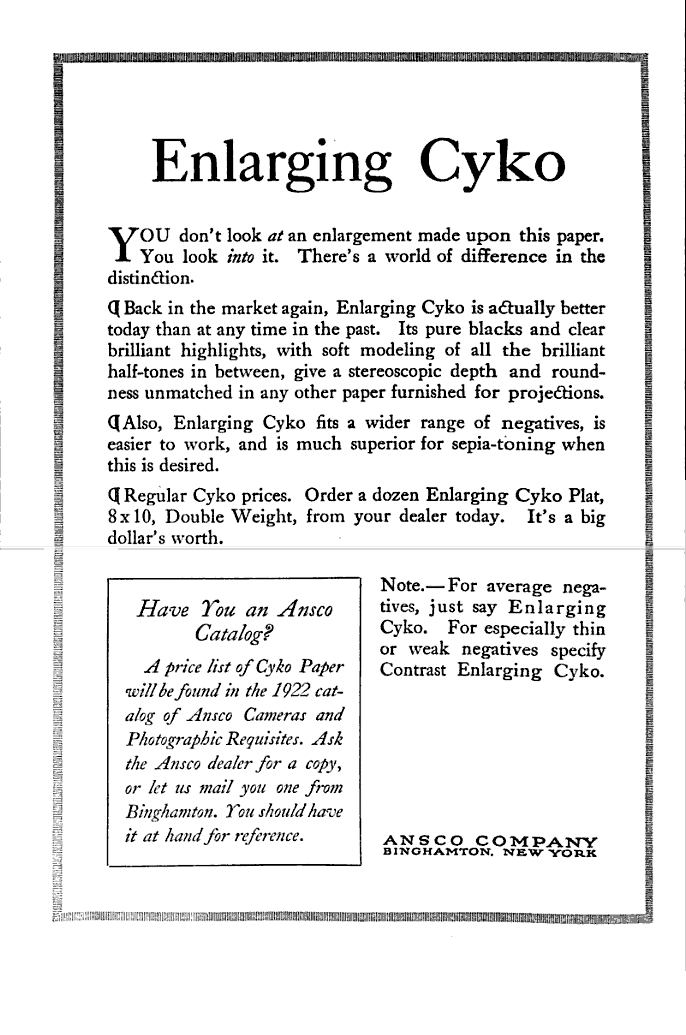
Advertisement for Cyko photographic paper, 1922.

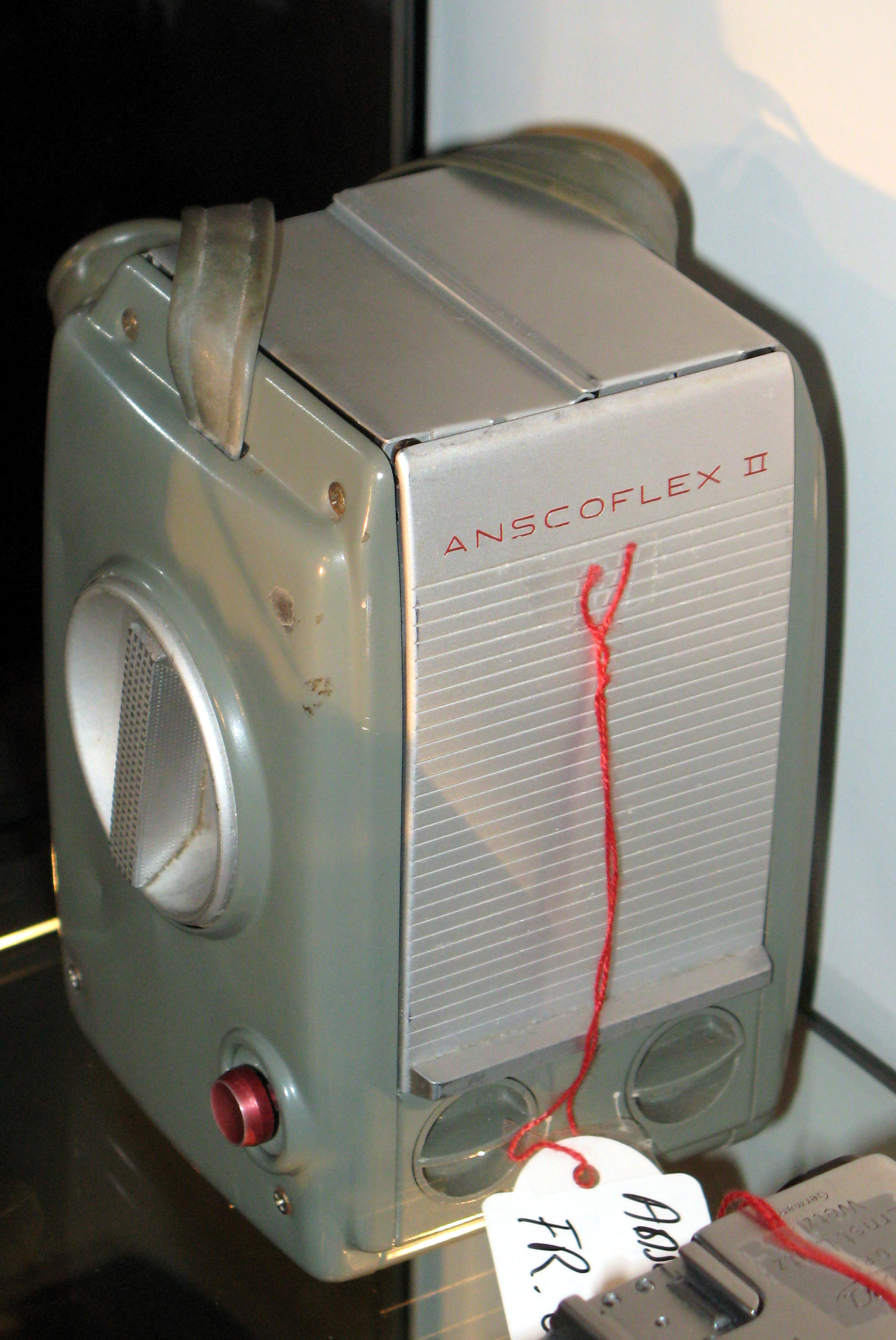
Anscoflex II, pseudo-twin lens reflex.

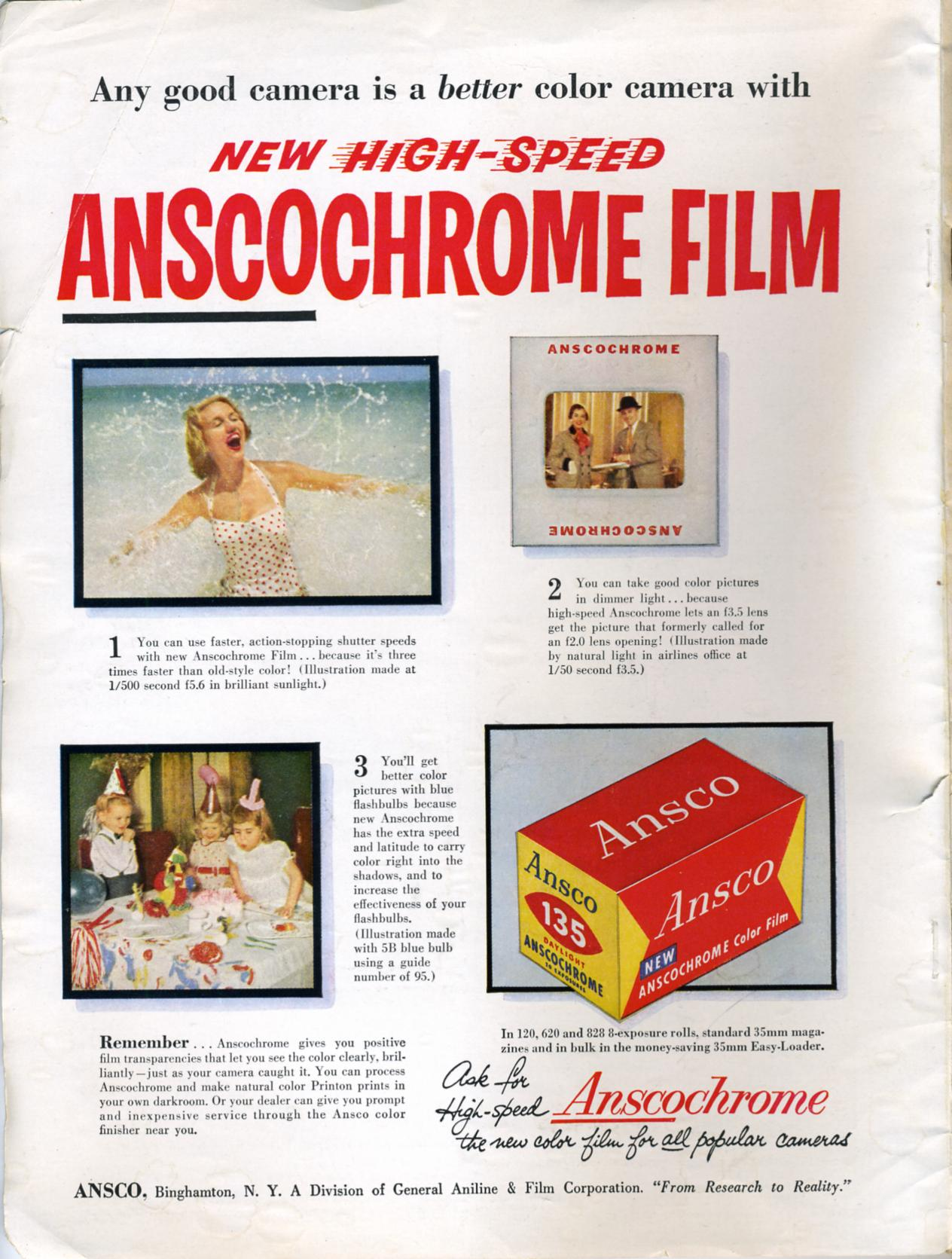
Advertisement for new higher speed Anscochrome film 1955.

Anscochrome 35mm slide, 1960, as it appeared after 50 years in storage.
