= E. & H. T. Anthony & Company =

Supplier and distributors of photographic supplies in the United States

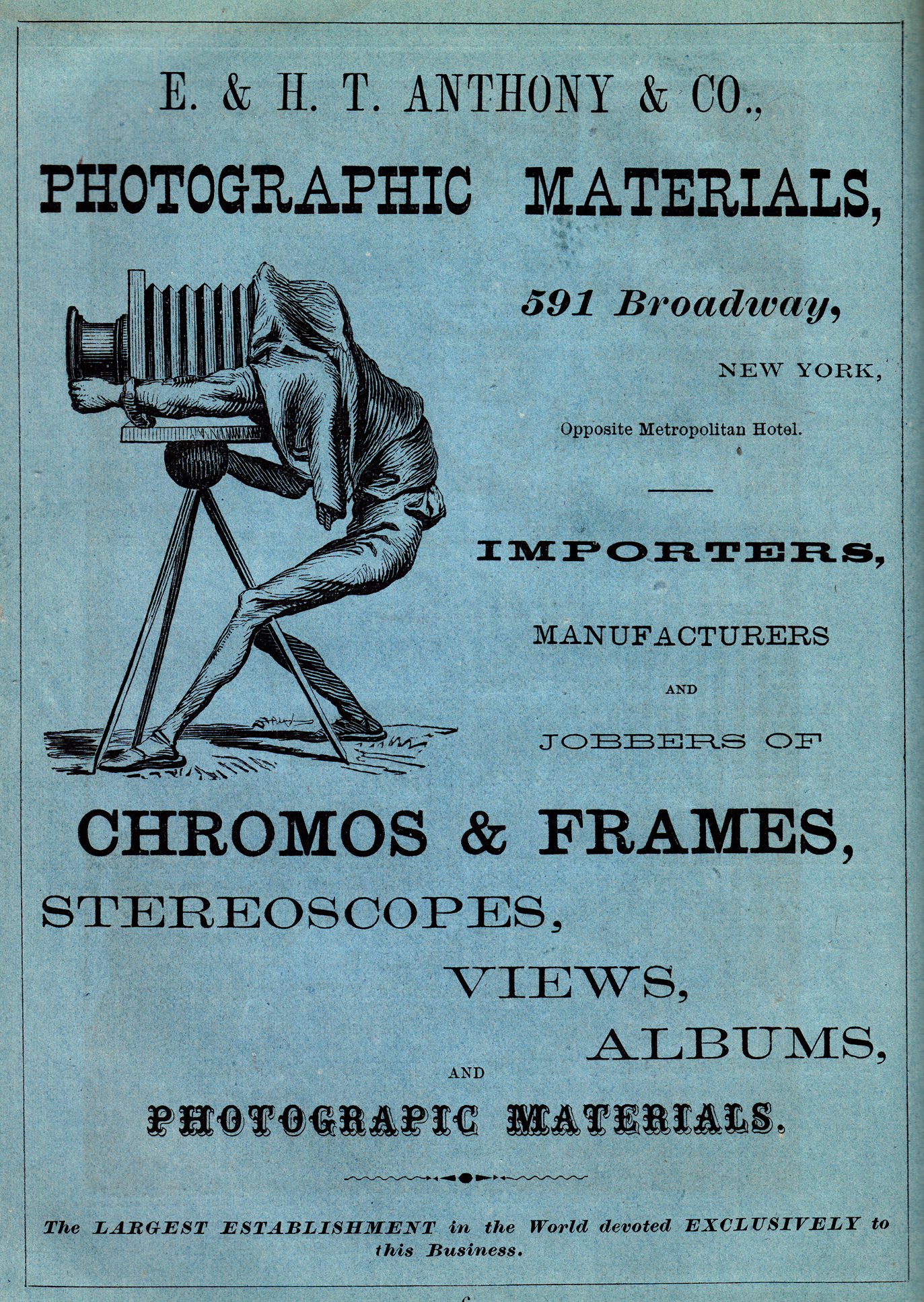
- Display ad for E. & H. T. Anthony & Company, 1870
- Industry: Photography
- Founded: 1842; 184 years ago in New York
- Founder: Edward Anthony; Henry T. Anthony
- Defunct: 1901; 1902
- Headquarters: New York City, United States

E. & H. T. Anthony & Company was the largest supplier and distributors of photographic supplies in the United States during the 19th century. The company is notable for capturing various important historical images of the time, including one of the only daguerreotypes taken of 7th President Andrew Jackson.

Company founder Edward Anthony, a Columbia College trained civil engineer who had studied photography with Samuel F.B Morse, started in the photography business in 1842 by opening a daguerreotype gallery in New York. Five years later he opened a separate shop devoted exclusively to photographic supplies and as sales grew rapidly ceased operations in his daguerrotypist gallery. In 1850 Anthony began the production of daguerreotype cases, camera boxes, and photographic chemicals. His brother, Henry T. Anthony, joined the business two years later in 1852.

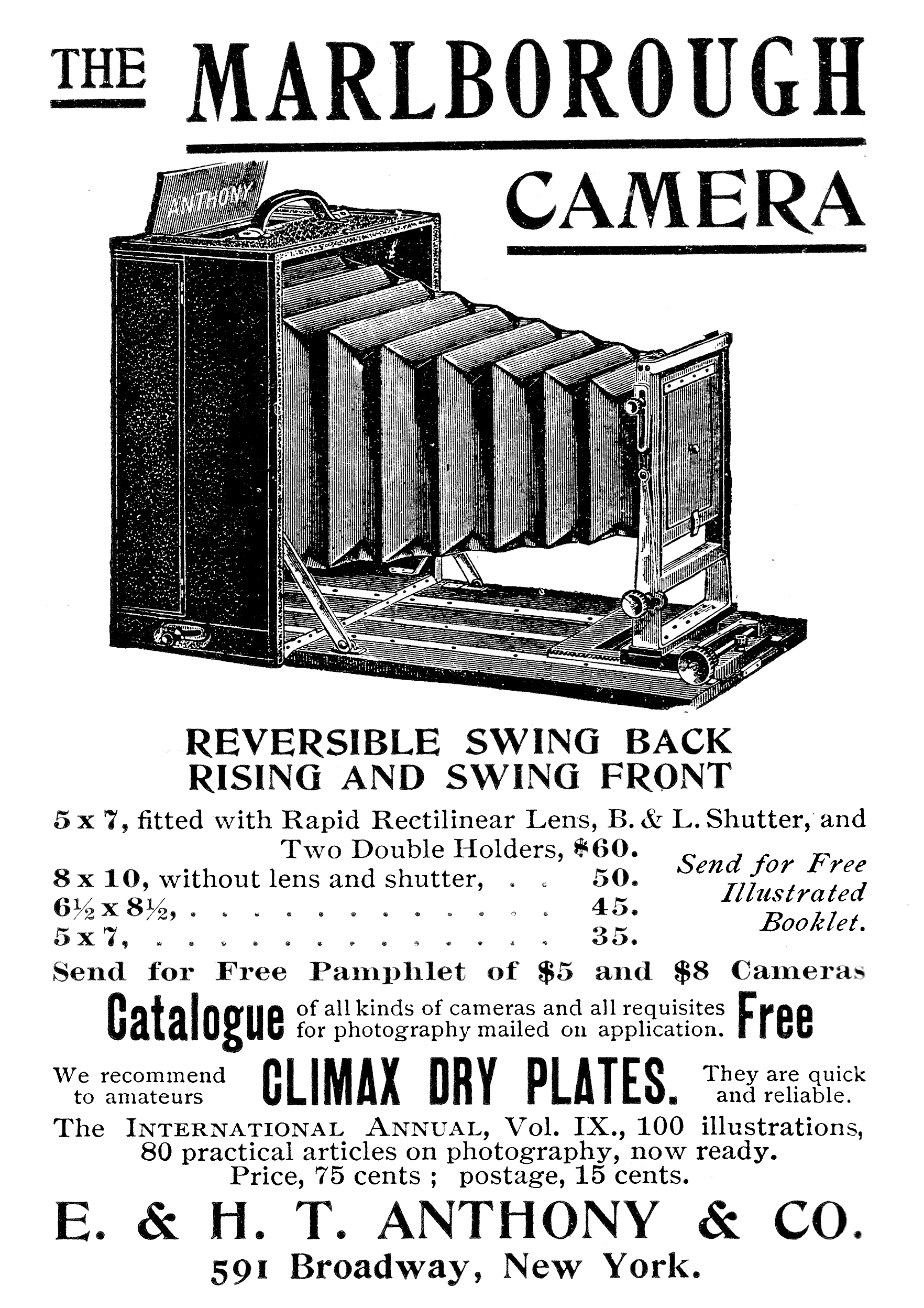
The "Marlborough" 1897

The Anthony brothers' factory was located at New York City's Harlem Railroad Depot occupying 1/4 of the building by 1854 and advertised that their company was the largest manufacturer and distributor of photographic apparatus and material in the world. In 1859 Anthony added stereoscopic view cards, photographic albums, and gallery furniture and backdrops to the company's product lines. The Anthony company also maintained a close business relationship with famed American photographer and portraitist Mathew Brady.

From February, 1870 until April, 1902 the company published a monthly magazine called Anthony's Photographic Bulletin which included many photographs and illustrations as well as a wide variety of contributed technical, practical, and scholarly articles along with advertisements for the Anthony company's products and other services. In the 1890s the company also developed and produced two consumer cameras of their own design—a camera-box called the "Buckeye" and a more expensive bellows-box type called the "Marlborough"—as well as an extensive line of photo cases and other products.

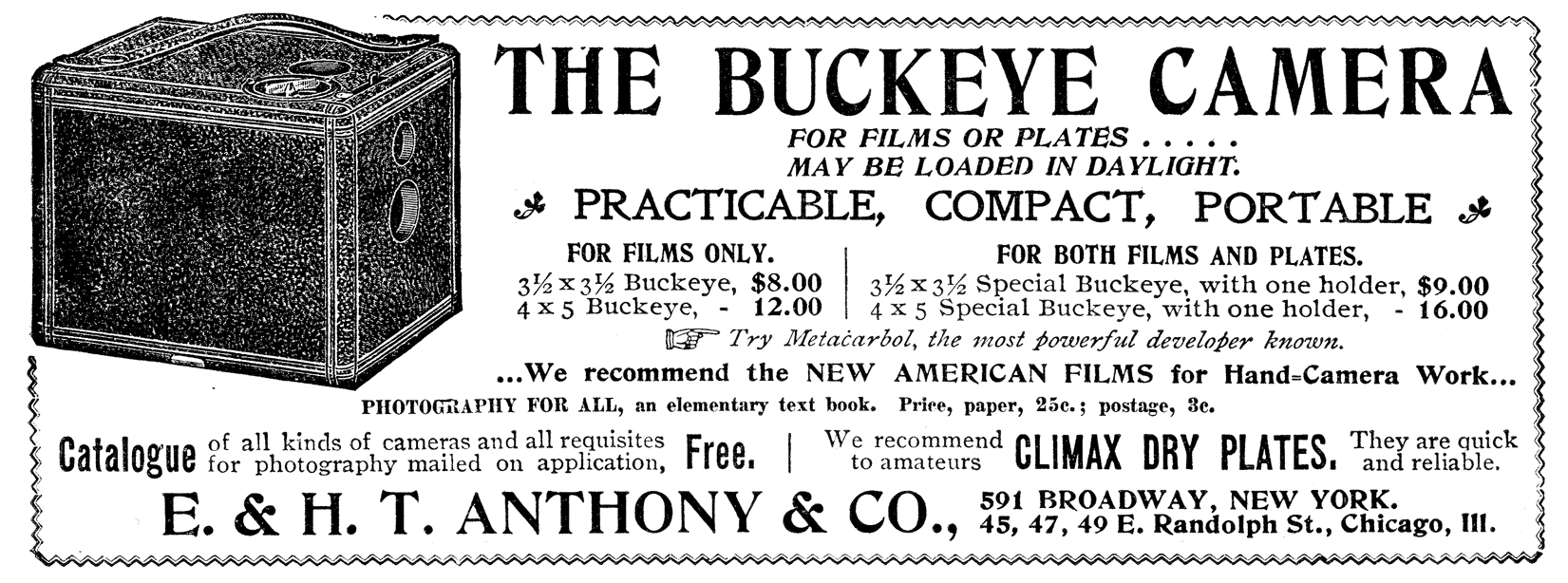
1898 advertisement for the Anthony Company's consumer "Buckeye" box camera

The firm's name was formally changed to E. & H.T. Anthony & Co. in 1862 and in 1877 was reorganized as a corporation with Anthony as president, his brother as vice-president, and Colonel V. M. Wilcox as manager and secretary. After death of both brothers, Wilcox became president, Richard A. Anthony (son of Edward Anthony) vice-president, and Frederick A. Anthony the secretary. In 1883 the company produced the first commercially manufactured hand instantaneous camera, called the Schmidt Patent Detective Camera, in America. E. & H.T. Anthony merged with the Scovill and Adams Company in 1902.

The E. & H. T. Anthony & Company was the corporate predecessor of the Ansco Company.

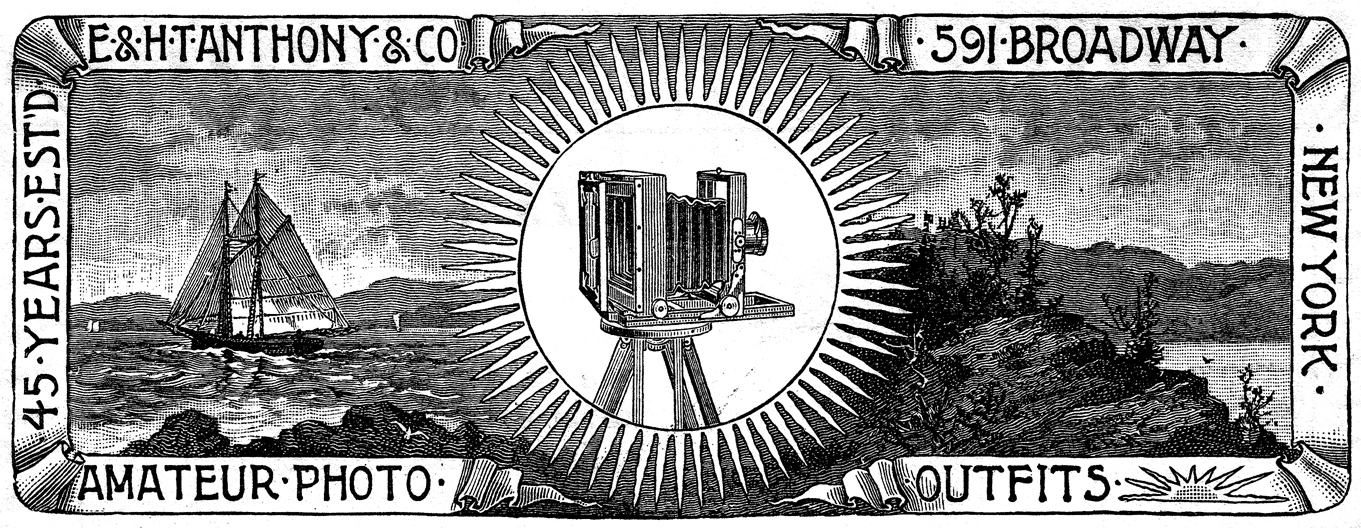
1892 E. & H.T. Anthony & Company advertisement for amateur photo outfits
