= Thomas C. Roche =

American photographer

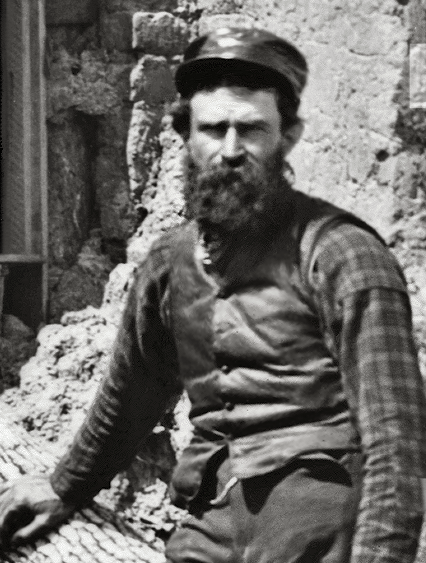
Self portrait of Roche

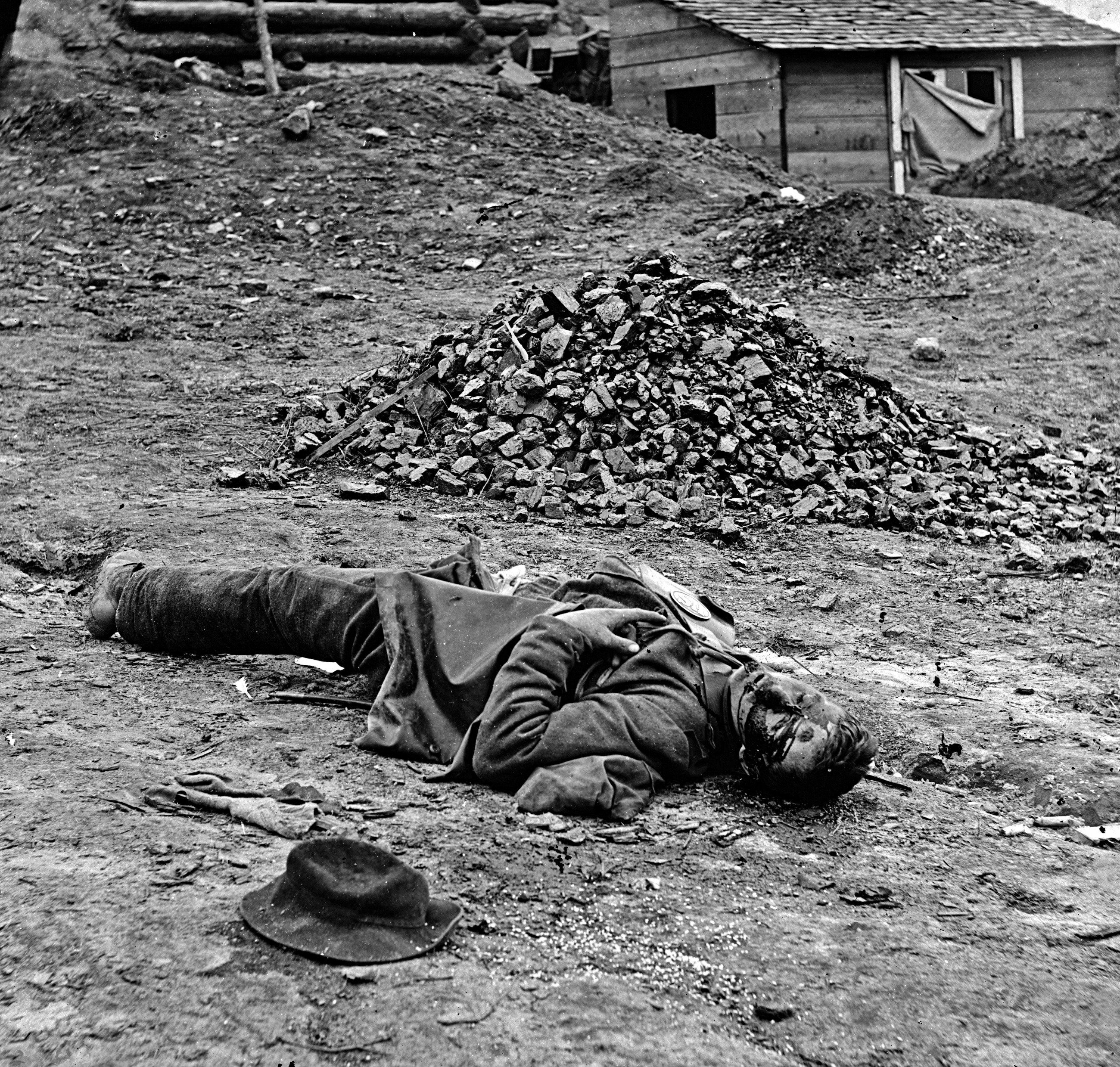
One of Roche's Civil War photographs, showing a dead Confederate soldier at Fort Mahone, Petersburg, Virginia April,1865.

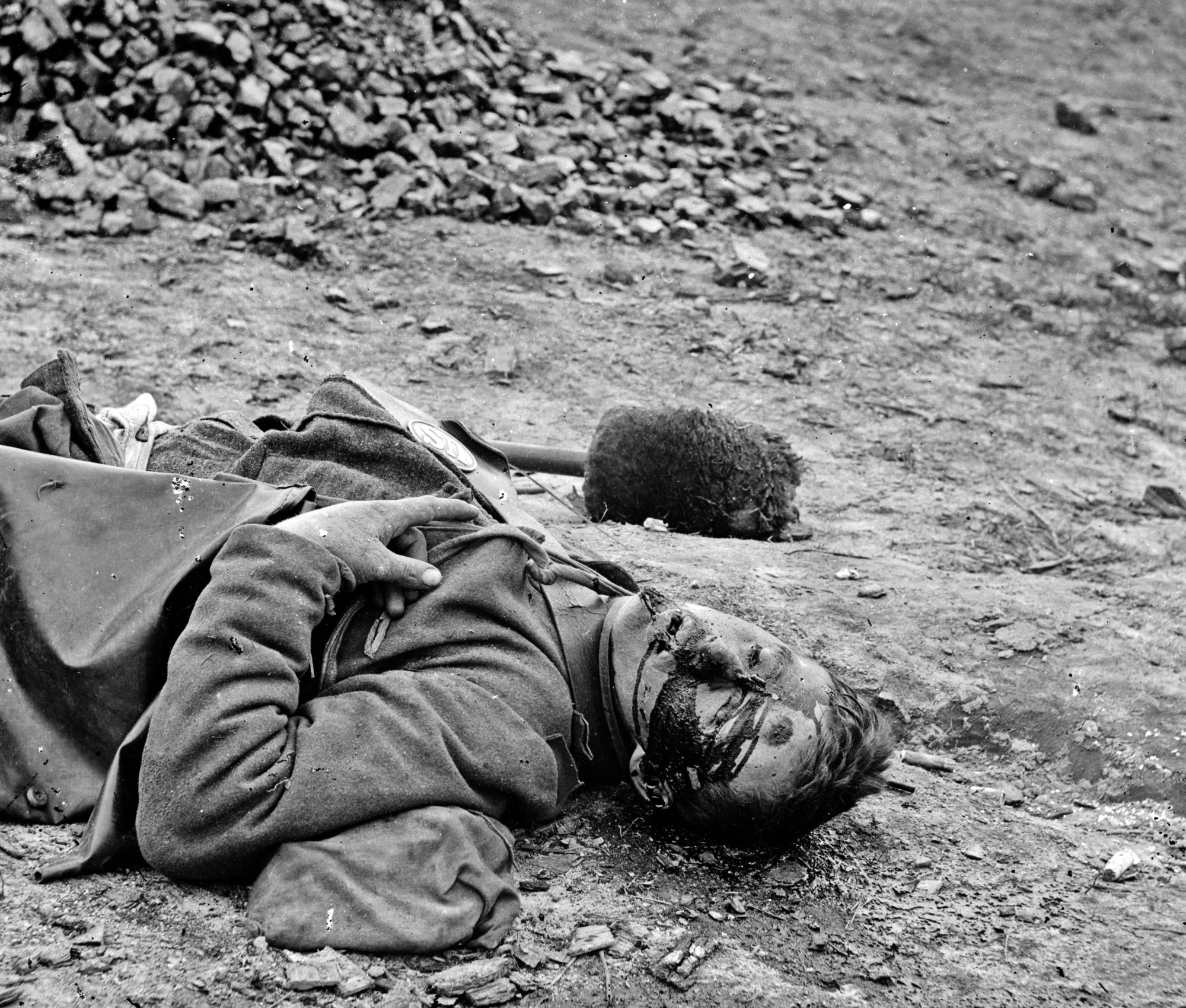
Variation of the above picture

Thomas C. Roche (c. 1826–1895) was a photographer known for his photographs of the American Civil War.

Roche's first job as a professional photographer was for Henry T. Anthony, a chemist in New York City, and his brother Edward, for whom he took photographs of the city and the harbor starting in 1859. He continued to work for the Anthonys during the Civil War, making photographs for his company's popular "Instantaneous Views." He also traveled on the front lines with the Army of the James. An anecdote describes Roche's reaction to the horrors of war while photographing the construction of the Dutch Gap Canal: after an artillery shell exploded next to him, it was said, "shaking the dust from his head and his camera he quickly moved to the spot and, placing it over the pit made by the explosion, exposed his plate as coolly as if there were no danger." By 1865, Roche was photographing for General Montgomery C. Meigs, Quartermaster General of the U.S. Army. Meigs wanted to document the logistical efforts that supplied the Union armies during the Siege of Petersburg. Roche would take many images of the Union base at City Point, Virginia. Roche's most well-known images are the photos of dead Confederate soldiers in the trenches outside of Petersburg soon after they were abandoned.

After the war, Roche returned to work for the Anthonys, with whom he published a book on photography.
