= American IG =

American holding company

American IG Chemical Corporation
- Industry: Chemical Industry
- Founded: 1929
- Successor: GAF Corp (Wilmington)
- Headquarters: New York, New York City, USA
- Products: Pharmaceuticals, photographic products, lightweight metals, synthetic gasoline, synthetic rubber, dyes, fertilizers, and insecticides
- Parent: IG Farben

The American IG Chemical Corporation, or American IG for short, was an American holding company incorporated under the Delaware General Corporation Law in April 1929 and headquartered in New York City. It had stakes in General Aniline Works (GAW), Agfa-Ansco Corporation, and Winthrop Chemical Company, among others, and was engaged in the manufacture and sale of pharmaceuticals, photographic products, lightweight metals, synthetic gasoline, synthetic rubber, dyes, fertilizers, and insecticides. The Moody's industrial manual listed an affiliation between IG Farben and American IG at the time of founding. The initial president of American IG was Hermann Schmitz, number two after Carl Bosch in IG Farben's hierarchy. Hermann's brother, Dietrich A. Schmitz, was appointed president next. American IG was re-incorporated as General Aniline & Film (GAF) Corporation in 1939 after a merger with General Aniline Works.

== Origin ==
American IG owes its genesis to a German business conglomerate, namely, Interessens-Gemeinschaft Farbenindustrie AG, or IG Farben for short. The business, along with the industrial empire that IG Farben controlled and commanded, has been described as "a state within a state."

The Farben cartel was created in 1925, when Hermann Schmitz, the master organizer, with Wall Street financial assistance, created the giant chemical corporation, combining six German chemical companies — Badische Anilin- und Sodafabrik Ludwigshafen (BASF), Bayer, Agfa, Hoechst, Weiler-ter-Meer, and Griesheim-Elektron. These six companies were merged into Interessen-Gemeinschaft Farbenindustrie AG, or IG Farben for short.

In the year 1929, the American holdings of IG Farben, namely, the American branches of Bayer Company, General Aniline Works (formerly Grasselli Dyes), Agfa-Ansco, 50% interest in Winthrop Chemical Company, and 50% in Alcoa's American Magnesium Corporation were incorporated under the laws of Delaware under the name American I.G. Chemical Corporation. The certificate of incorporation was filed with the Securities and Exchange Commission in 1929. American IG was controlled by a Swiss holding company in Basel called Internationale Gesellschaft für Chemische Unternehmungen AG (International Corporation for Chemical Engineering) or IG Chemie.

The controlling interest of this entity rested with IG Farben in Germany. In the following decade before the outbreak of the Second World War, the American IG Chemical Corporation, or American IG, played important role in manufacturing of dyes, chemicals, and fertilizers, among others. Among its board of directors members were Edsel Ford and Walter C. Teagle.

In 1933–1939, American IG repeatedly denied its ties with I.G. Farben and reported to the U.S. Securities and Exchange Commission, first, that it "had no parent", then, that it "did not know if whether it had a parent."

On October 30, 1939, after a merge with General Aniline Works, the stock of American I.G. Chemical Corporation was transferred to General Aniline & Film Corporation. Its assets were valued as $10,880,860 with holdings in Standard Oil ($6,979,946), Sterling Products Inc. ($2,424,320), and du Pont ($899,250).

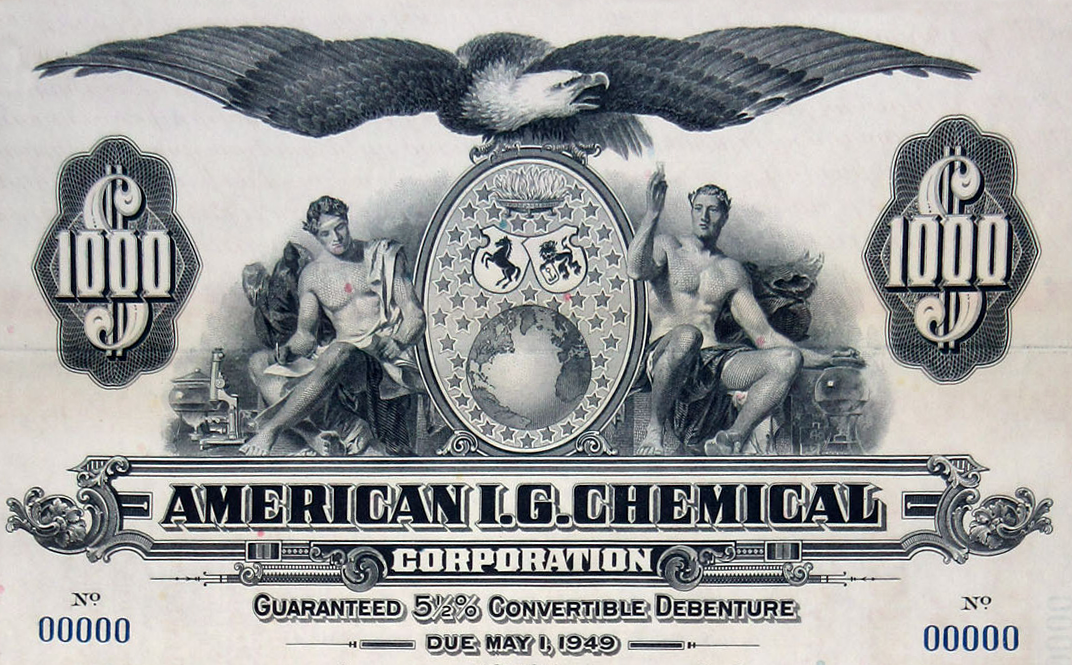
1929 American IG Chemical Corporation debenture

== Legacy ==
On the eve of World War II, IG Farben, the German chemical conglomerate, was among the largest manufacturing enterprises in the world and exercised extraordinary economic and political clout in Nazi Germany and abroad. During the war it became the principal source for Zyklon B, the pesticide used in German concentration camps to murder their victims. From 1942 to 1945, the company used slave labor from Nazi concentration camps. After 1945, three former members of the board of governors of American IG were tried and convicted as German war criminals.

In the United States IG Farben's power was broken by the Justice Department even before the war started, and Assistant Attorney General, Thurman Arnold played a prominent role in uncloaking the association of IG Farben's American affiliates with its parent company. After the United States entered the WWII, the Office of Alien Property Custodian starting from March 11, 1942, took control of all Nazi Germany-related assets in the country.

In 1952, IG Farben was split into Agfa, BASF, Bayer, and Hoechst.

In 1965, the U.S. government sold General Aniline & Film, or GAF stock.

As a result of its 1966 acquisition of Sawyer's, GAF went on to produce the View-Master, a children's toy, made today by Mattel's Fisher-Price division. GAF today still exists as GAF Materials Corporation, mainly as a manufacturer of asphalt and building materials.

== See also ==
- Interhandel
