= General Cigar Company–Ansco Camera Factory Building =

- General Cigar Company–Ansco Camera with Factory Building
- U.S. National Register of Historic Places
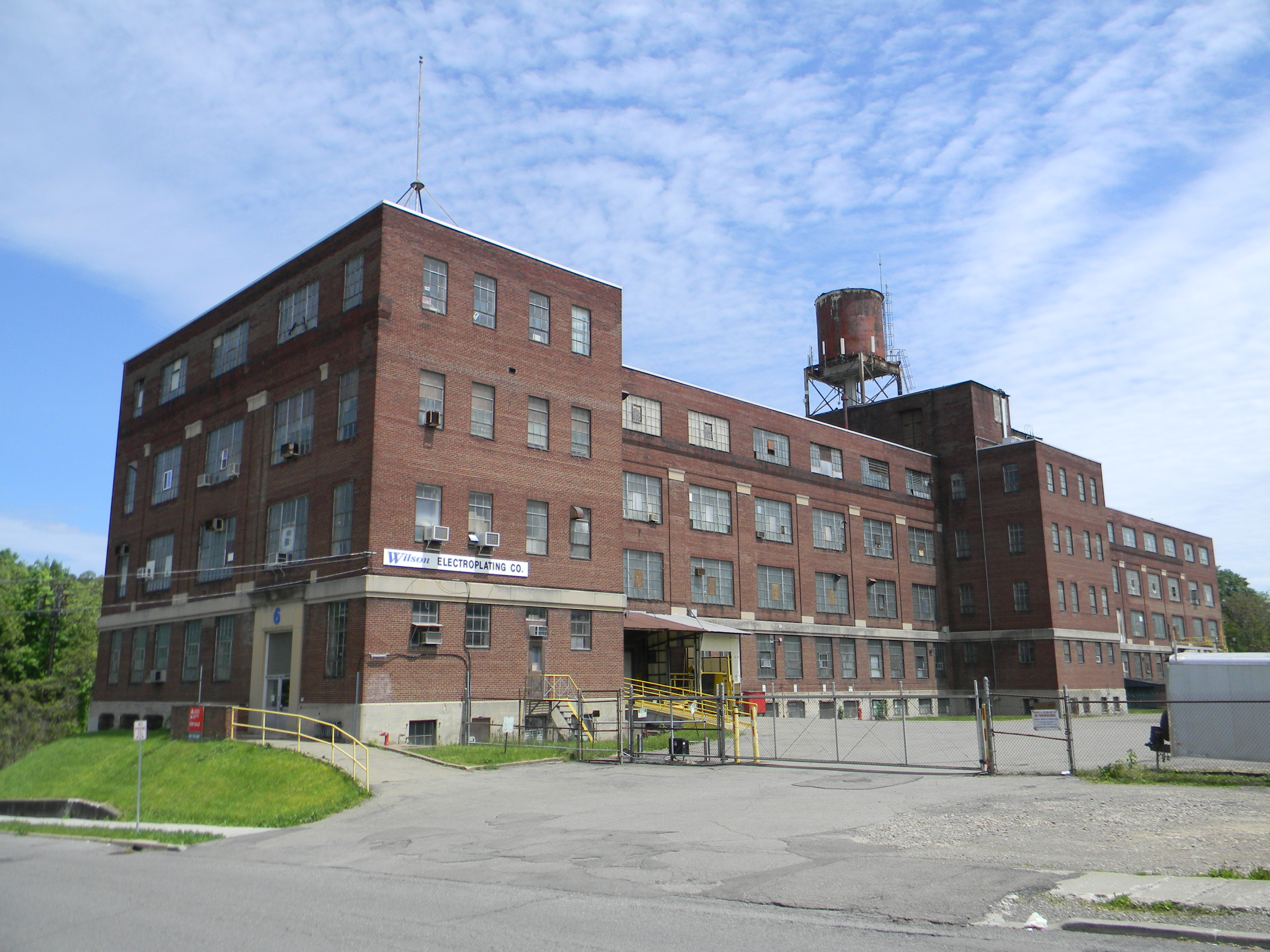
- General Cigar Company–Ansco Camera Factory Building, May 2017

- Location within New York Location within the United States
- Location: 16 Emma St., Binghamton, New York
- Coordinates: 42°06′39″N 75°56′31″W
- Area: 3.29 acres (1.33 ha)
- Built: 1927-1928, 1938, 1950
- Built by: Bowie-Clark Construction Co.
- Architect: Freeman, Alfred
- MPS: Industrial Resources of Broome County, New York
- NRHP reference No.: 12000532
- Added to NRHP: August 22, 2012

General Cigar Company–Ansco Camera Factory Building, also known as Agfa-Ansco, General Aniline and Film (GAF), and Anitec, is a historic factory complex located at Binghamton, Broome County, New York. It was originally built in 1927-1928 for the General Cigar Company; Ansco purchased the factory in 1937. The factory building is a four-story brick building with basement, five bays wide and 20 bays long. It has an intersecting four-story wing and two-story addition constructed in 1950. The building measures approximately 62 feet wide and 402 feet long. The powerhouse is a one-story, steel frame and brick building measuring 36 feet wide and 52 feet long. The buildings housed manufacturing operations of Ansco for cameras and photographic equipment. The factory closed in 1977.

It was listed on the National Register of Historic Places in 2012.
