= Henry T. Anthony =

American photographer and businessman

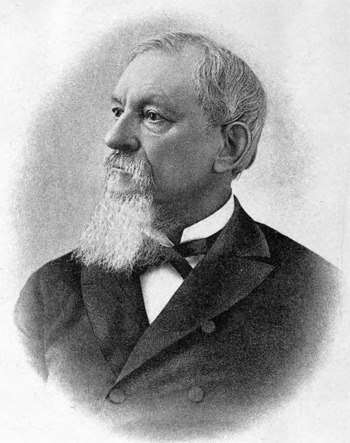
- Born: September 18, 1814; New York, United States
- Died: October 11, 1884 (aged 70); New York, United States
- Scientific career
- Fields: Photography

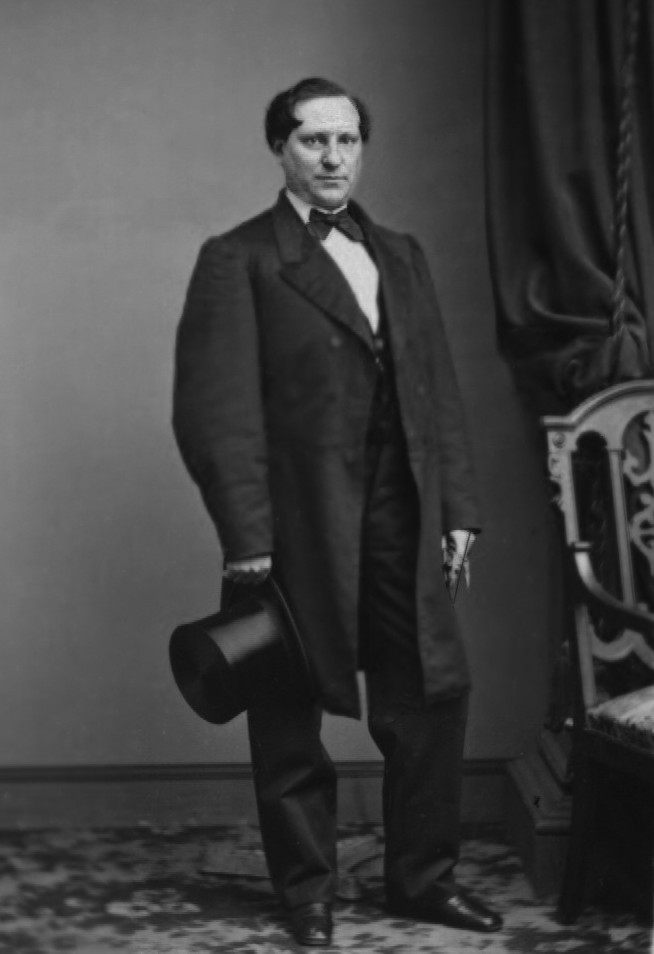
Henry T. Anthony c. 1860

Henry Tiebout Anthony (September 18, 1814 – October 11, 1884) was an American photographer and the vice president of the E. & H. T. Anthony & Company, which was the largest manufacturer and distributor of photographic supplies in the United States during the 19th century. Henry Anthony was a brother of Edward Anthony and had a close business relationship with Mathew Brady.

== Biography ==
Anthony was born in New York. Jacob Anthony, his father, was for many years one of the principal bank tellers in The United States Branch Bank and cashier of the old Bank of the State of New York. The family derives their descent from Allard Anthony, an immigrant from Holland to New Amsterdam about 1628, who was one of the first five councilmen of the new colony. In 1828, Henry Anthony entered the Columbia College and graduated with honors four years later. After that, he worked intermittently as a civil engineer, at the Erie railroad, Croton Aqueduct and Hudson River railroad, and as a clerk at the Bank of New York. In 1839 he became interested in the new art of photography, which he learned along with his brother Edward. Soon after Edward established his photography firm, Henry joined him in 1852, the firm becoming the E. & H. T. Anthony & Company. In 1877, the firm was reorganized as a corporation, with Edward as president, Henry as vice-president, and Colonel V. M. Wilcox as manager and secretary. After the death of both brothers, Wilcox became president, Richard A. Anthony (son of Edward Anthony) vice-president, and Frederick A. Anthony the secretary.

Within the company, Henry was responsible for the manufacturing department and improved the use of colloidal and paper printing processes. In 1855, he became the editor of the Annual Bulletin of Photographic Invention and Improvement, which was published by the company in altered forms until and after his death in 1884. He died suddenly, a few days after being hit by a passing vehicle while crossing a street in New York.

Anthony was a member of the first organized baseball club, the New York Knickerbockers, in the 1840s.
