= Edward Anthony (photographer) =

American photographer (1819–1888)

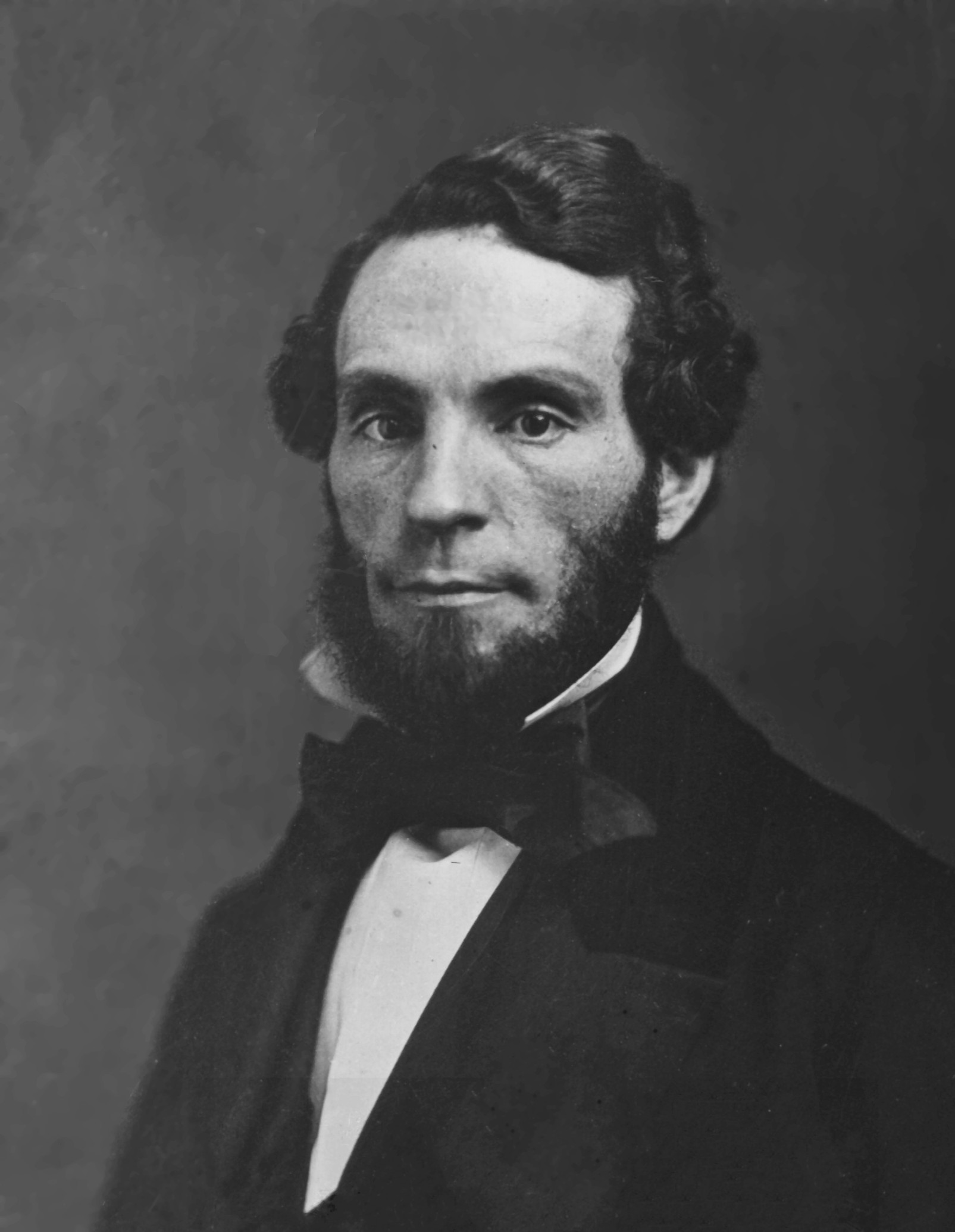
- Edward Anthony c. 1860
- Born: January 31, 1819; New York City, United States
- Died: December 14, 1888 (aged 69); New York City, United States
- Scientific career
- Fields: Photographer

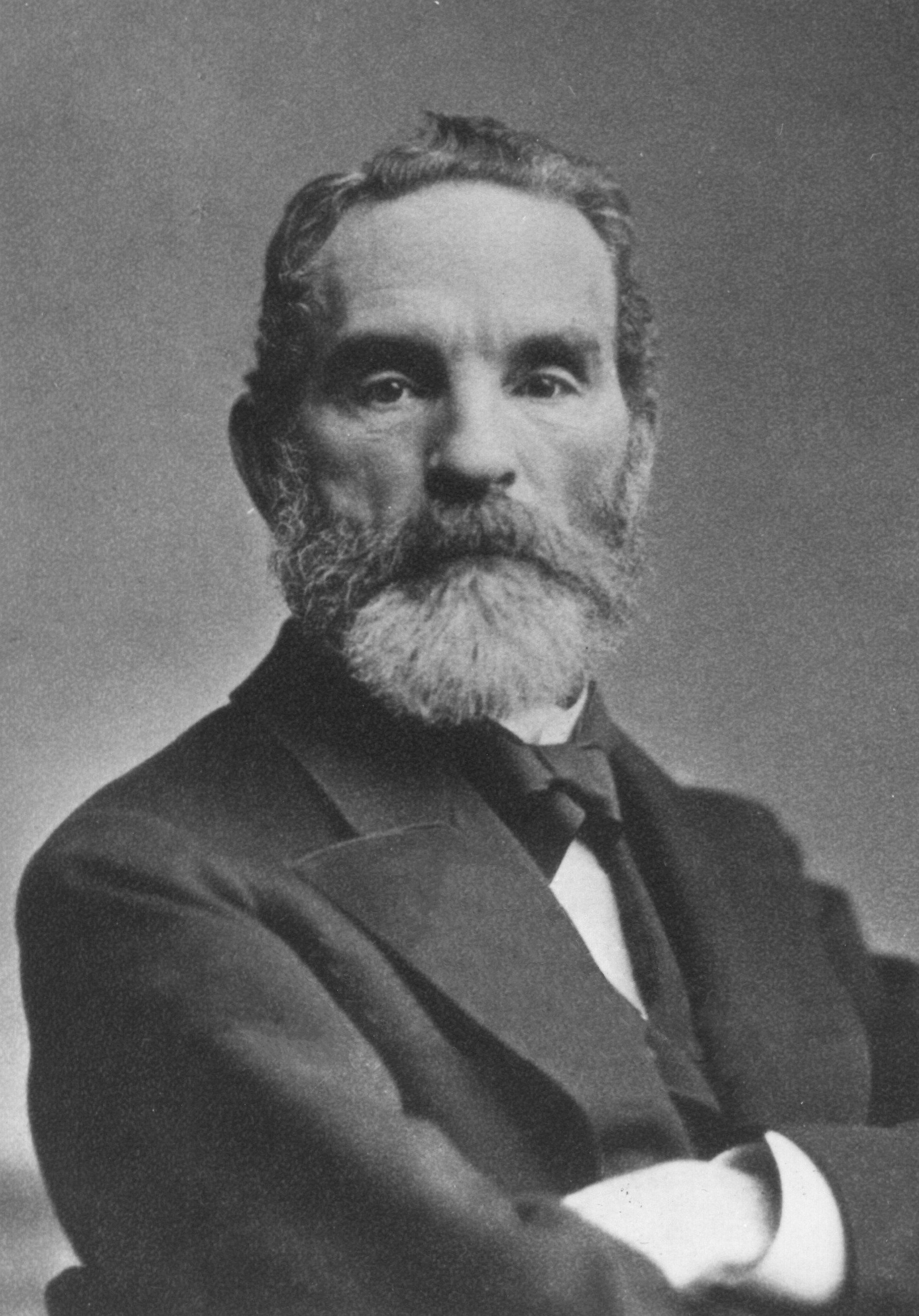
Edward Anthony c. 1880

Edward Anthony (January 31, 1819 – December 14, 1888) was an American photographer and one of the founders of E. & H. T. Anthony & Company which was the largest manufacturer and distributor of photographic supplies in the United States during the 19th century. Edward Anthony was a brother of Henry T. Anthony and had a very close business relationship with Mathew Brady.

== Biography ==
Anthony was born in New York City. Jacob Anthony, his father, was for many years one of the principal tellers in The United States Branch Bank and cashier of the old Bank of the State of New York. The family derives their descent from Allard Anthony, an immigrant from Holland to New Amsterdam about 1628, who was one of the first five councilmen of the new colony. Edward Anthony graduated from Columbia College in 1838, with an excellent record. Beginning life as a civil engineer, he obtained employment in building the original Croton Aqueduct, through which New York long drew its supply of pure drinking water from country streams and ponds. Before its completion, he was called to accompany Prof. James Renwick in the survey of the northeastern boundary of Maine, at the time of the dispute with Great Britain. He had for some time amused himself with experiments in the new art of making pictures with the aid of sunlight, just introduced by Louis Daguerre. During the survey, he took satisfactory images of the hills along the boundary line, the existence of which had been denied by England. It was the first instance in which the art of photography had been made use of in diplomatic controversy. These photographs are still preserved in the archives at Washington.

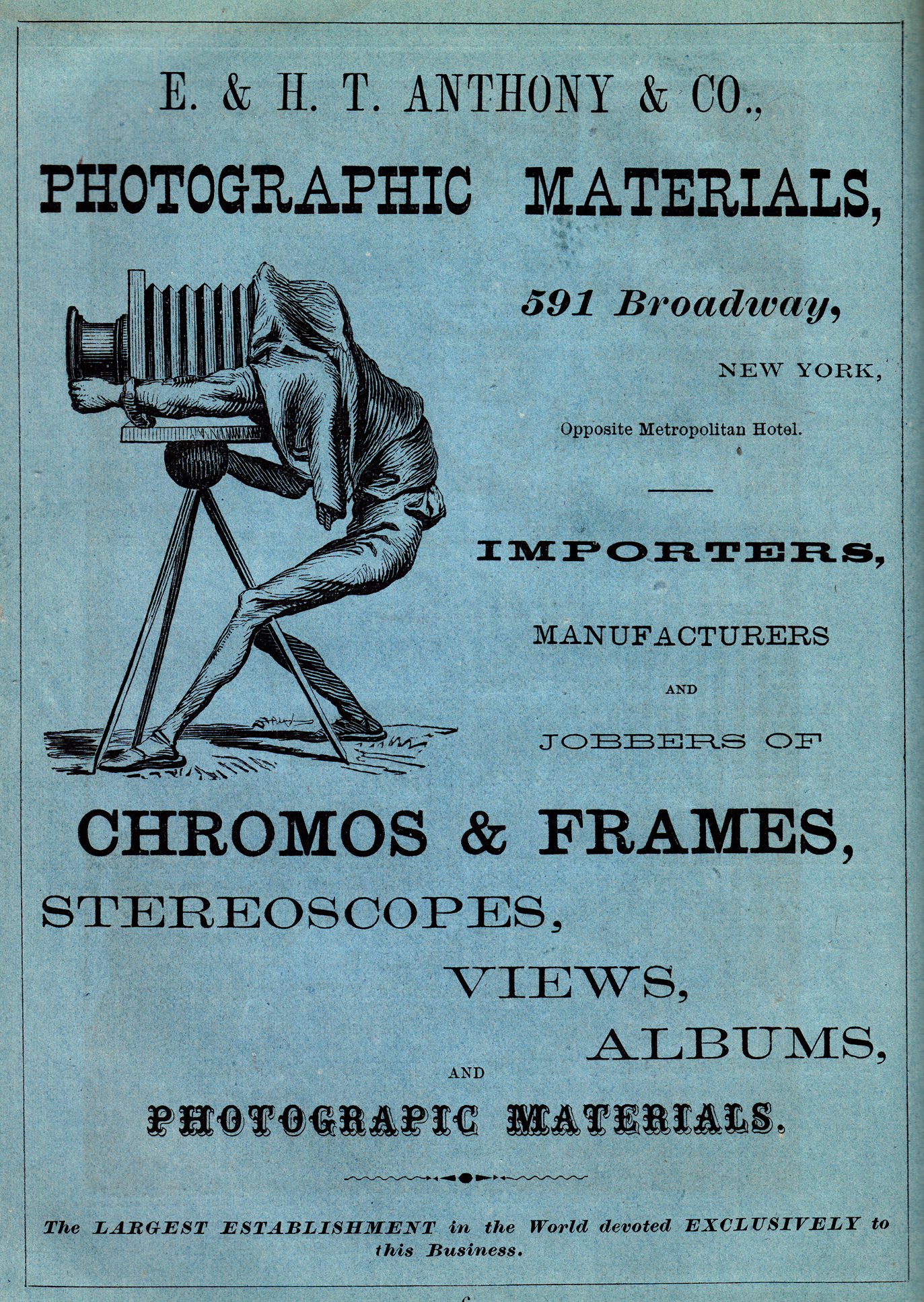
Display ad for E. & H. T. Anthony & Company, 1870

After finishing the survey, Anthony engaged in photography, and after a short but successful practice embarked in the business of supplying materials to the trade. His practical knowledge proved of invaluable assistance, and soon placed the house of E. Anthony in the front rank in New York. Henry T. Anthony, his brother, joined him in 1852, the firm becoming the E. & H. T. Anthony & Company. In 1877, the firm was reorganized as a corporation, with Anthony as president, his brother as vice-president, and Colonel V. M. Wilcox as manager and secretary. After the death of both brothers, Wilcox became president, Richard A. Anthony (son of Edward Anthony) vice-president, and Frederick A. Anthony the secretary.

In 1848 Anthony married Margaretta R. Montgomery, daughter of James Montgomery. They had a son, Richard A. Anthony (born May 24, 1861), and two daughters: Jane Kipp and Eleanor Montgomery. After receiving his BA and MA degrees from the Rutgers College and Columbia College, Richard joined the E. & H. T. Anthony & Company.

Anthony died of heart failure on December 14, 1888, a week after a sudden attack.
