= Interhandel =

Swiss industrial and financial company (–1967)

I.G. Farben / I.G. Chemie logo

Interhandel, short for Internationale Industrie & Handelsbeteilungungen, was a Swiss conglomerate, known for its long-running disputes with the U.S. government over German ownership during World War II. Interhandel, which had both financial as well as industrial holdings was the corporate successor of I.G. Chemie, which the U.S. government had claimed was a front organization for Germany's I.G. Farben during World War II.

Interhandel was publicly traded in Switzerland from its formation as IG Chemie with a complex structure of ordinary and preference shares, which concentrated voting rights with an array of Swiss investment banks. Approximately 80% of its capital was tied up in the long-running GAF investment, with the remainder consisting of various small chemical companies, Bank Hoffman of Switzerland, a small bank in Panama and various property investments - most of which had been acquired after the end of World War II, under the control of Managing Director Walter Germann, a relative of M. Greutert, a banker and the I.G Farben representative on the I.G. Chemie board of directors.

In 1958, prior to the successful resolution of the GAF/Interhandel case in the United States, a number of shareholders who had previous links to I.G. Farben (including Industrie Bank and M. Sturzenegger) were bought out, and UBS Bank’s chairman Dr. Alfred Schafer became chairman of Interhandel.

In the years prior to this, UBS acquired approximately 50% of Interhandel shares on the open market. Upon the announcement that Interhandel would receive $122,000,000 USD in compensation for the seized shares of the former I.G. Farben U.S. subsidiaries (GAF), a tremendous uplift in the value of the Interhandel shares was realised, allowing UBS to gradually take control and absorb the cash in a 1967 merger.

The company was acquired by the Union Bank of Switzerland in 1967.

== History ==
Interhandel's predecessor, I.G. Chemie, was established in 1928 by the German company I.G. Farben as a Swiss holding company, located in Basel, Switzerland, to hold the company's foreign investments. The company owned a group of financial and industrial businesses in Europe and the United States, including American IG.

By 1940, I.G. Chemie had severed its direct ownership from its parent company I.G. Farben in order to avoid the seizure of its U.S. assets. Shortly after the start of the U.S. involvement in the War, on April 24, 1942, the U.S. government seized General Aniline & Film (later GAF Materials Corporation), an Interhandel subsidiary, and it was not until 1963 that the long-running dispute between Interhandel and the U.S. government was resolved. The shares in GAF Corporation were sold in a highly competitive auction in 1965 and the proceeds were split between Interhandel and the U.S. government. As a result of the sale of GAF, at the time of its merger with UBS, Interhandel held substantial amounts of cash.

The addition of the Interhandel's capital resources, which propelled UBS into the top spot among Swiss banks in 1968, also made UBS one of the strongest banks in Europe and helped fuel the bank's further expansion in the late 1960s and 1970s.

== The IG Chemie case ==
All of IG Chemie's American assets were seized by the United States government under the Trading with the Enemy Act of 1917. These assets, seized between 1942 and 1946, included bank accounts in six New York banks, and over 90% of the capital stock of General Aniline & Film Corporation (today GAF Materials Corporation, then part of the holdings of American IG).

I.G. Chemie was accused of participating in a conspiracy with I.G. Farben, which had by then been designated a German enemy corporation "...to conceal, camouflage and cloak the ownership, control and domination by I.G. Farben of properties and interests in many countries of the world, including the United States, other than Germany". The Swiss banking partnership Ed. Greutert & Cie (later Sturzeneggar & Cie, today Baumann & Cie, Banquiers) was also accused of involvement.

IG Chemie, seeking to recovery its properties, filed a lawsuit on October 21, 1948. IG Chemie claimed that it was neither an enemy or ally of an enemy of the United States. As plaintiffs, the holding company filed a motion under Rule 34 of the Federal Rules of Civil Procedure for the discovery of documents from the government. A similar motion was filed by the government, "including documents of subsidiaries of the plaintiff, Osmon A.G., and Sturzenegger & Cie.". Overruling objections by IG Chemie, the court ordered full production of the documents.

The government fulfilled the order but the plaintiff filed another motion after the Swiss government prohibited H. Sturzenegger & Cie from transmitting the records. They said transmission of these records would violate Swiss penal law. Because they could not produce the documents as ordered, even though it was accepted that the plaintiff had made good faith efforts to produce the Sturzenegger documents, the plaintiff's suit to recover their seized properties was dismissed with prejudice because they had been unable to meet the compliance standard of the US courts required for legal procedures.

== See also ==
- American IG
- GAF Materials Corporation
- Union Bank of Switzerland
