= Schiedel =

Austrian chimney manufacturing company

Schiedel GmbH
- Type: Gesellschaft mit beschränkter Haftung (GmbH)
- Founded: 1946; 80 years ago
- Headquarters: Nußbach, Austria
- Area served: Worldwide
- Key people: Alberto Kölmel (President)
- Products: Chimney & Stove systems
- Revenue: 200 million EUR (2018)
- Number of employees: 1,400 (2018)
- Website: www.schiedel.com

Schiedel is an Austrian company that is a supplier of chimney, stove and ventilation systems worldwide with headquarters in Nussbach. Schiedel offers ceramic chimneys, steel chimneys, fireplaces, and ventilation systems.

The company has 26 production sites (7 central production sites and 19 local production sites) in 26 countries and a staff of approximately 1,400 employees.

== History ==
The enterprise was founded in 1946 by Friedrich Schiedel in Erbach near Ulm, Germany. Since then, the company has undergone many changes under several owners.

In 1967 the Schiedel group was founded, which was taken over by BRAAS/Redland in 1990. In 1998 Schiedel was taken over by Lafarge Roofing, a supplier of roof components. Today Schiedel GmbH is part of the international Braas Monier Building Group (before known as Lafarge Roofing), a provider of building materials for pitched roofs as well as roof, chimney, and ventilation systems, with operations in 42 countries on four continents.

In 2006, after Schiedel expanded to North America. In 2018 the company had a yearly turnover of approximately 200 million euros.

== Products ==
Schiedel produces a ceramic and steel chimney systems, including systems for single- and multi-family houses in the residential business and country-specific options designed for local climatic conditions, building regulations and construction methods. It also offers chimney systems for the non-residential sector as well as mechanical and natural ventilation systems.

The main product lines are:

- Ceramic chimney systems: the ceramic chimney systems consists of an inner ceramic liner, an insulation and a blockstone around it
- Steel chimney systems :steel chimney systems for both inside and outside. The product range comprises single-wall, twin-wall and flexible systems.
- Ventilation systems: mechanical and natural ventilation
- Fireplaces: open fireplaces, chimney inserts and stoves.
