= Tommy Roche =

- Born: Thomas Roche; 12 October 1918 Ballagh, Mullingar, County Westmeath, Ireland
- Died: 1 May 1999 (aged 80) Mullingar, County Westmeath, Ireland
- School: St. Mary's C.B.S., Mullingar

Rugby union career
- Position: Hooker
Senior career
Years	Team	Apps	(Points)
1945	Monkstown R.F.C.		
1946–47	Mullingar R.F.C.		
Provincial / State sides
Years	Team	Apps	(Points)
1946	Leinster	1	(0)

Thomas Roche (12 October 1918 – May 1999) was an Irish rugby player, and rugby club president. Hailing from Mullingar, Roche played for Monkstown RFC, after which he played for Mullingar RFC Following his retirement from playing, he became the president of Mullingar RFC.

== Early life ==
Thomas Roche was born on 12 October 1918, in the townland of Ballagh, Mullingar, County Westmeath. His parents were Thomas Roche, a cattle dealer, and Kathleen Burns, a former school teacher; they had been married in 1916. A month before he was born, Tommy's father died from the Spanish flu, leaving his mother to raise him during his infancy as a single mother. She remarried, in 1921, to Edward Hope, with whom she had eight more children.

Roche was educated in St. Mary's C.B.S., Mullingar, and after finishing school, he moved to Tullamore in 1938.

== Rugby career ==
Roche began his rugby career in 1938, when he joined Tullamore Rugby Club. During The Emergency (WW2), he was a despatch rider for Irish Army. He played for eleven different rugby clubs during those years. After the war came to an end, Roche joined Monkstown RFC, before putting rugby on hold to work as a sales representative in Limerick. He played for Mullingar RFC during the 1946/47 season, where played as a hooker, and won a cap for Leinster. However, Roche's rugby career was cut short by an illness after only one year playing for Mullingar, and he retired.

== President of Mullingar R.F.C. ==
During the 1950s, Tommy Roche held the position of President of Mullingar R.F.C., and during his tenure, the club won the Midland league for the first time. In the 1980s, a members' bar was set up in the team's clubhouse, and named the "Roche T. Room" in honour of him.

== In media ==
Tommy Roche, also known as "Roche T.", was described in his obituary in the Westmeath Independent as "one of the Midlands' best loved personalities". He was a friend of the singer Joe Dolan, another Mullingar native, and he was said in the latter's official biography to be the "possessor of one of the most famous stutters in Ireland". One incident that was recalled in the biography was about a time when Dolan introduced Roche to the Soviet ambassador to Ireland, in advance of an upcoming tour in the Soviet Union. The ambassador asked Roche who he was, to which he jokingly replied in his trademark stammer, "I'm the interpreter".

In 1964, when Gay Byrne was the host of show, Roche made an appearance on The Late Late Show. He was also known by some as the "King of the Galway Races".

== Death ==
Tommy Roche died at the age of 80 in May 1999, in Saint Francis Private Hospital, Mullingar, after a long illness.
