= Braas Monier Building Group =

Building materials company

Braas Monier Building Group S.A.
- Trade name: Braas Monier
- Type: Société anonyme
- ISIN: LU1075065190
- Industry: Building materials
- Founded: 2009; 17 years ago
- Headquarters: Luxembourg
- Areas served: Europe; Africa; Asia
- Key people: Georg Harrasser (CEO)
- Revenue: €1,235.8 million (2016)
- Number of employees: 7,922 (2016)
- Website: braas-monier.com

Braas Monier Building Group, also known as Braas Monier, is a manufacturer of building materials for pitched roofs and roofing accessories in Europe, some Asian markets, and South Africa. The company's produces concrete and clay roof tiles, roofing accessories, ceramic and steel chimneys, and energy systems. Braas Monier is headquartered in Luxembourg.

By its own account, Braas Monier has operations in 36 countries with 121 production facilities (as of 31 December 2016). In 2016, the Group generated revenues of €1,235.8 million. As of 31 December 2016 Braas Monier had 7,922 employees. Since 25 June 2014 Braas Monier is listed on the Prime Standard at the Frankfurt Stock Exchange and was listed on the SDAX from 22 September 2014 until 2 February 2017.

== Corporate structure ==
=== Board of directors ===
The company is led by a one-tier board structure, consisting of a Board of Directors which must be composed of a minimum of three members and a maximum of ten members, to be appointed by the general meeting of shareholders of the company for a maximum term of six years.

Non-executive directors

- Jean-Pierre Clavel
- Christopher Davies
- David J Millstone
- Jason I. Pollack
- John F. Rebele
- Tony Robson
- David S. Winter

=== Senior management ===
The following also serve on the board as executive directors:

- Georg Harrasser, Chief executive officer
- Matthew Russell, Chief financial officer

== Brands and subsidiaries ==
=== Revenues by region ===
In 2016 Braas Monier generated revenues of €1,235.8 million. Those were divided up between the regions as follows:

Region	Revenues in %
Germany	27
UK	12
France	10
Asia & Africa	9
Nordic & Baltic	10
Italy	6
Other Europe	26

=== Brands ===
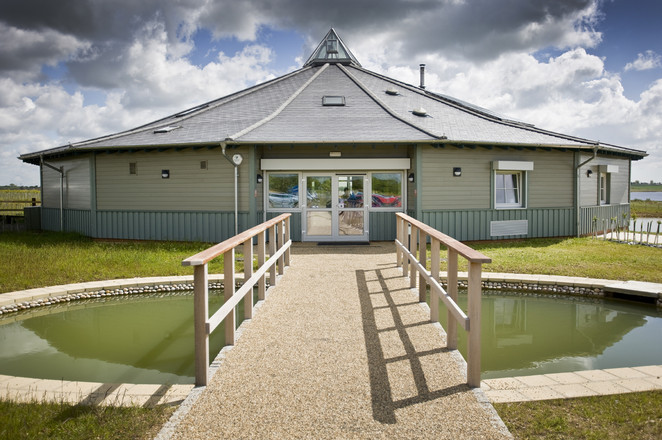
Wildlife visitor centre near Colchester, Essex, UK with "Cambrian Slate" from Redland

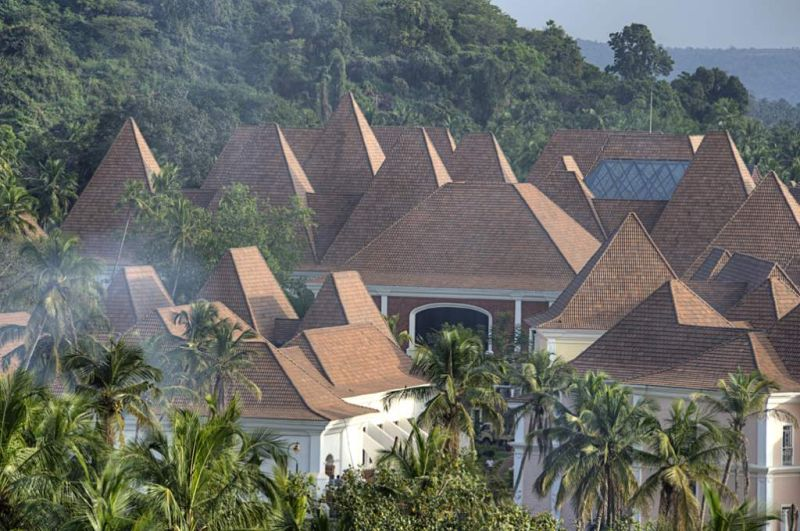
The Grand Hyatt Hotel in Goa, India, with "Elabana" concrete roof tiles from Monier India

The following international product brands are part of Braas Monier Building Group:

Braas
Braas is the Group's brand for Germany, Poland, Russia, Switzerland and Turkey. The bestselling product of the company, the "Frankfurter Pfanne", is also part of the Braas brand.

Bramac
de:Bramac is the brand for the Southeast European markets. Bramac is seated in Austria. In addition, Bramac has locations in Czech Republic, Hungary, Slovakia, Romania, Bulgaria, Slovenia, Serbia, Bosnia and Herzegovina and Croatia. Since 2011, Braas Monier owns 100% of Bramac; before that Braas Monier and Wienerberger each held 50%.

Cobert
In 2015 Braas Monier took over Cobert, the Spanish and Portuguese market leader for roof tiles. Currently Cobert is selling roof tiles in over 50 countries on five continents. In Spain and Portugal the company has seven production facilities.

Coverland
Founded under the name "Vereeniging Tiles Ltd." in 1949, Coverland emerged from the merger of four roof tile manufacturers in 1976. The company has eight production facilities and three storage sites in South Africa.

Monier
The brand Monier is being used in Belgium, Denmark, Estonia, Finland, France, Italy, Latvia, Lithuania, the Netherlands, Norway and Sweden as well as in China, Malaysia, India and Indonesia.

Redland
Redland was founded in 1919 in the UK and thus represents the oldest brand within the company. Its foundation also lays the basis for the foundation of the later Braas Monier Building Group. Redland products are available in the UK and Ireland.

Schiedel
Schiedel is a European manufacturer of chimneys and energy systems seated in Nußbach/Austria. The company was founded in Erbach near Ulm/Germany in 1946 and is currently present in 19 European countries. Since 1990 Schiedel is part of Braas Monier.

Wierer
Wierer is a roofing brand in Italy. Braas Monier is selling roof tiles as well as roofing accessories under the name Wierer. The company was founded in Kiens in South Tyrol in 1963, where Monier Italy still has its headquarters.

=== Locations (administration, sales, production) ===
Braas Monier is represented in the following countries in Europe, Africa and Asia:

- Albania
- Belgium
- Bosnia-Herzegovina
- Bulgaria
- China
- Germany
- Denmark
- Estonia
- Finland
- France
- UK
- Italy
- India
- Indonesia
- Croatia
- Latvia
- Lithuania
- Malaysia
- Netherlands
- Norway
- Austria
- Poland
- Portugal
- Romania
- Russia
- Sweden
- Switzerland
- Serbia
- Slovakia
- Slovenia
- Spain
- South Africa
- Czech Republic
- Turkey
- Hungary
- Ukraine

== Technical centre ==
Braas Monier operates a so-called Technical Centre for research and development with locations in Heusenstamm near Frankfurt/Main, Germany, and in Crawley in the South of London, UK, where new and existing products are being developed and tested. Here, geologists, material scientists, chemists, physicists, product designers and engineers work together in interdisciplinary teams. Products are subject to tests for handling, wind load, fire behaviour, weather resistance and ventilation. Thousands of product samples are placed for regular review in the company's own weathering stations in eight countries all over the world in order to simulate their behaviour under different climates.

=== Wind tunnel ===
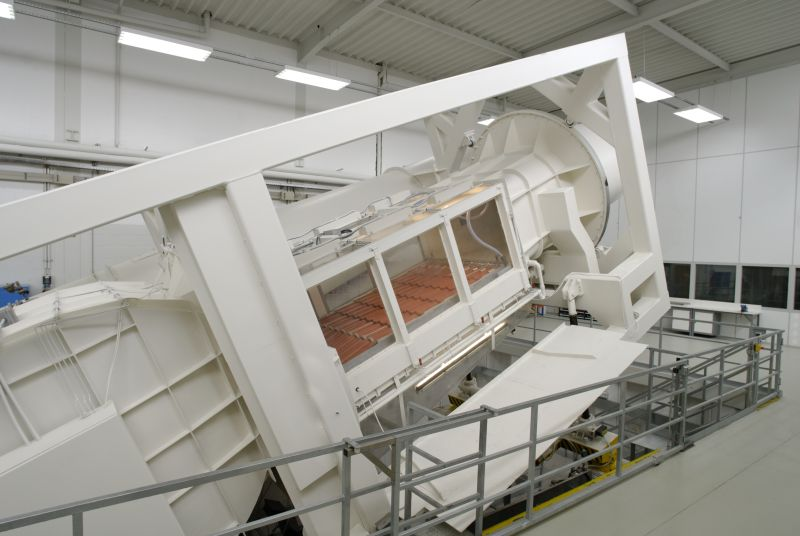
Wind tunnel at the Technical Centre in Heusenstamm

A wind tunnel, located at the Technical Centre in Heusenstamm, is able to simulate extreme weather conditions which typically arise only every 50 years. Fans, sprinkling nozzles and a hydraulic system for changing the roof pitch help to test the products in four weather scenarios. Tests will be run until water leaks from the bottom of the roof and thus the maximum load has been determined. Products which have been tested successfully are – for instance by Braas Germany – being issued with a 30-year-guarantee for the material and an additional 30-year-guarantee for frost resistance.

=== Collaboration in external committees, associations and organisations ===
Employees of Braas Monier's Technical Centre are actively involved in the following committees, associations and organisations which – among others – work on the development of industry standards: European Cool Roofs Council, National Federation of Roofing Contractors, Building Research Establishment, International Organization for Standardization (ISO), IFD International Federation for the Roofing Trade, European Committee for Standardization (CEN), British Standards, Cool Roof Rating Council, Deutsches Institut für Normung, National House Building Council, Construction Products Association, lifeHEROTILE.

== Products ==
=== Product categories ===
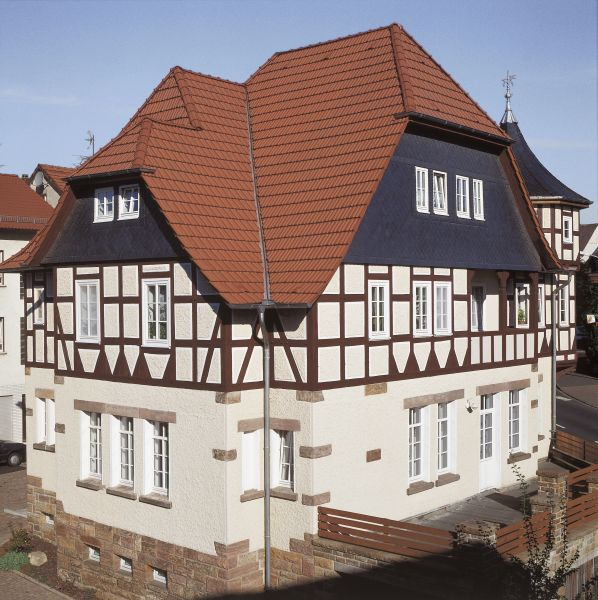
Timbered house with Braas clay tile "Granat 13" in Oberaula, Germany

Roof tiles	Concrete tiles and clay tiles for the pitched roof
Roof accessories	Ridge and hip, underlays, roof outlets, snow and safety systems, gutters, valleys, windows, abutments, eaves, fixings, insulation, solar thermal and photovoltaic systems
Jacketing for HVAC systems	WrapTec is a material for the jacketing of HVAC (heating, ventilation and air conditioning) systems
Chimneys and energy systems	Ceramic chimneys, steel chimneys, fireplaces, ventilation systems

== History ==
=== Foundation ===
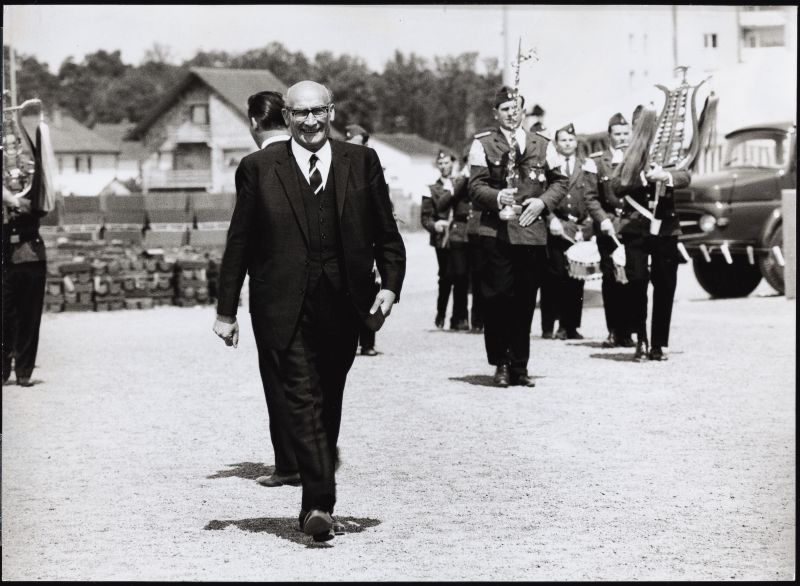
Rudolf H. Braas

The company was founded in the UK as the "Redhill Tile Company", in 1919, with production of its first concrete roof tiles started November of this year. In 1946, the company changed its name and became "Redland Tiles". After an expansion period between 1949 and 1951 in which Redland invested in South Africa, Australia and Malaysia, the company bought the majority of Braas in Germany. Braas’ founder, de:Rudolf Braas, had already had closed contacts with his British colleagues for some time. Still in the same year, the company's parent plant was built in Heusenstamm near Frankfurt/Main, Germany.

=== "Frankfurter Pfanne" ===
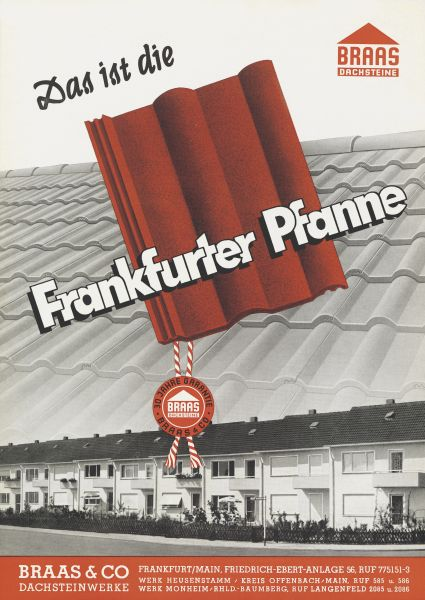
Advertisement for "Frankfurter Pfanne" from the 1950s

From its market entry in 1954 until now, the "Frankfurter Pfanne" (English: Double Roman) has been the most laid concrete tile model in Germany. The main ingredients of a concrete roof tile are sand, concrete, water and colour pigments on an iron oxide basis. From the beginning, Braas gave a 30-year-guarantee on the materials of the "Frankfurter Pfanne" and was thus the first manufacturer in Germany to give long-term guarantees on building materials. In 1958, four years after market entry, the word and figurative mark "Frankfurter Pfanne" was registered with the patent office.

Today there are six models of the "Frankfurter Pfanne" in 13 different colours and two surfaces. Today Braas Monier is selling the "Frankfurter Pfanne" all over the world.

=== Growth and acquisitions ===
In the early 1950s Braas Monier expanded into non-European markets for the first time by going into South Africa, Australia and Malaysia. Further expansion to Southeast Asia and Austria followed in the late 1960s and to other European countries at the beginning of the 1970s. The market entries into Japan, Indonesia, Malaysia and the USA between 1973 and 1979 marked one of the strongest expansion periods of the company. From 1993 the Group entered further markets like Scandinavia, the Baltic States, Poland and Russia. In 2001, the worldwide production network could be expanded to over 200 plants.

Two of the major acquisitions were Schiedel (1991) and Klöber. Since 2011 Braas Monier holds 100% of the Austrian company Bramac. In January 2015, the Group announced the acquisition of roof tile manufacturers Tejas Cobert (Spain) and CT Cobert Telhas (Portugal). In 2015 and 2016 Braas Monier took over the leading manufacturer of clay roof tiles in Malaysia, Golden Clay Industries (GCI), the Italian clay roof tile manufacturer Ceprano Coperture S.r.l. and the Danish manufacturer of roof accessories J.A. Plastindustri S/A.

=== Ownership changes ===
==== Redland Braas Building Group ====
In 1996, Redland and Braas united their roof tile manufacturing activities and became Redland Braas Building Group.

==== Lafarge (Braas) Roofing ====
One year later, in 1997, Lafarge, a leading worldwide manufacturer of construction materials, took over Redland and established a new business division, Lafarge Roofing.

==== Monier/Private Equity ====
On 28 February 2007, Lafarge sold the majority of Lafarge Roofing for 2.4 billion euros to private equity investor PAI partners. PAI partners now held 65% of the company, Lafarge 35%. On 1 January 2008 the Group changed its name from Lafarge Roofing to Monier.

In June 2010, Monier was taken over by Apollo Global Management, TowerBrook Capital Partners and York Capital Management, in a landmark debt-for-equity restructuring. The European Commission approved the acquisition of joint control of Monier by the three firms on 26 April 2012.

==== Braas Monier Building Group ====
In 2013, the Group changed its name to its present one: "Braas Monier Building Group".

==== Initial public offering (IPO) ====
When going public, the owners of Braas Monier Building Group placed 15.47 million of their holding as well as 4.3 million new shares at a price of 24 million euros on the capital markets. At the time of the initial public offering (IPO) the market capitalisation was around 940 million euros. The Group's shares are now mainly in free float. The company was first listed on the regulated market (Prime Standard) of the Frankfurt Stock Exchange on 25 June 2014.

New ownership

On 3 April 2017, Standard Industries acquired Braas Monier Building Group. Together with Icopal, a company for flat roof systems, Braas Monier is now BMI Group and forms the European part of the Standard Industries group.
