= Allard Anthony =

Coat of Arms of Allard Anthony

Allard Burgtem Antonides (1620–1685) was one of five Schepens (Dutch for aldermen or magistrate) in New Amsterdam and early New York City, the city that was to become New York City. As a representative of New Amsterdam and the New Netherlands colony, Antonides made significant contributions during his appeals to the Dutch monarchy.

In 1664, when the British Empire conquered the colony, Antonides anglicized his surname to 'Anthony' or 'Antony' and maintained his post until shortly before his death. Antony then became a Schout of New Amsterdam from 1664 through 1667. He was later the First Sheriff of New York City. Though he represented the Dutch colonists, his direct descendants are said to be of Spanish ancestry, possibly gaining access to the Netherlands during the Spanish occupation before its establishment as a separate nation.

== See also ==
- Nine Men
