= GAF Materials Corporation =

American manufacturing company

- Type: Manufacturing company
- Industry: Roofing
- Founded: 1886
- Headquarters: United States
- Key people: John Barkhouse (CEO)
- Products: Asphalt shingles TPO, ISO, PVC; Roofing accessories Coatings
- Number of employees: 5,000+
- Parent: Standard Industries

GAF is an American manufacturing company based in Parsippany, New Jersey. Operating as a subsidiary of Standard Industries, GAF is the leading roofing and waterproofing manufacturer in North America, with 30 locations across the U.S. GAF produces both commercial and residential roofing products, as well as pavement coatings. John Barkhouse is the company’s current CEO.

== History ==
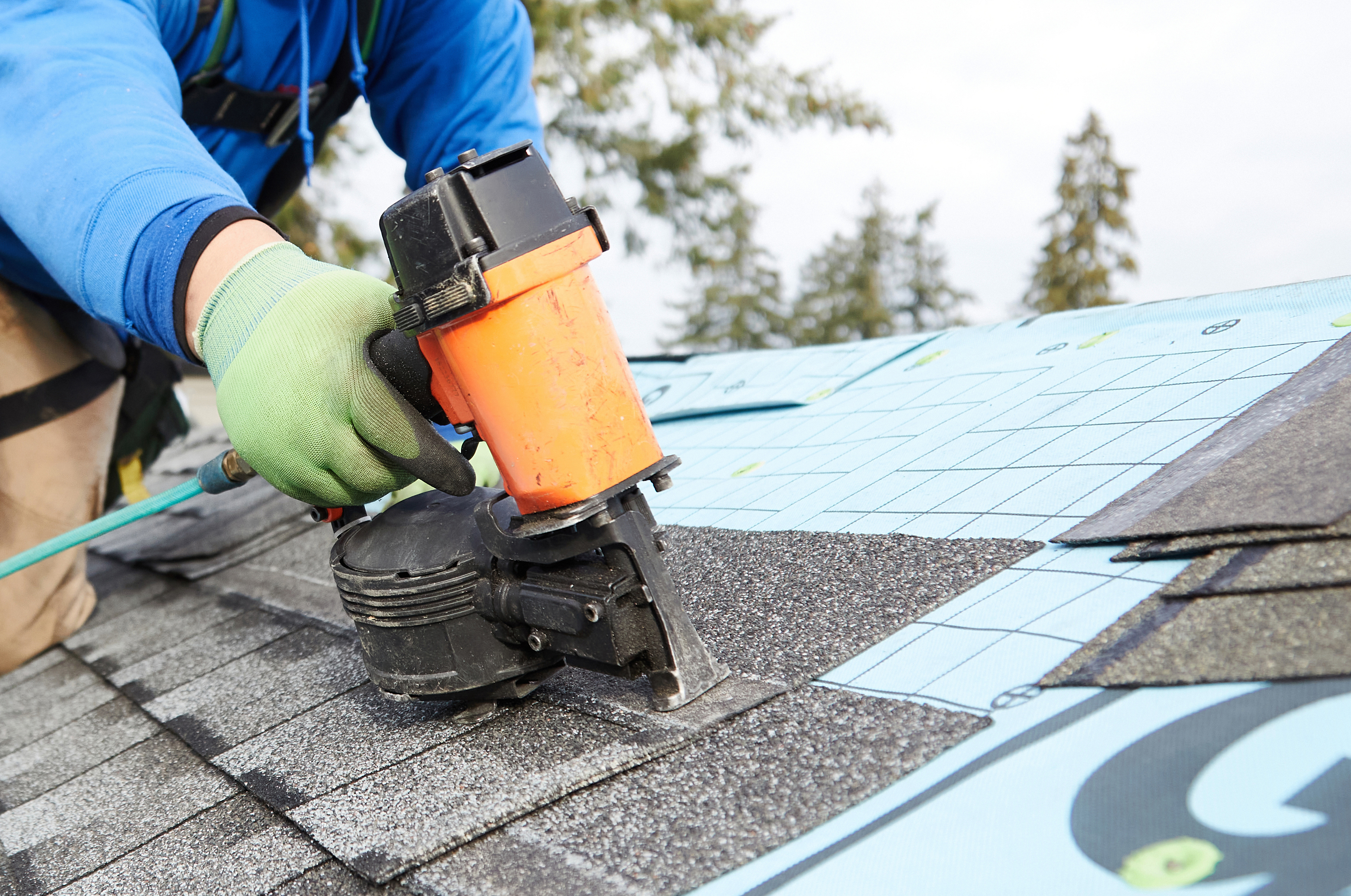
Residential Roofing Process

Originally founded as the Standard Paint Company, GAF was established in 1886 in Bound Brook, New Jersey. The company originally produced waterproof and insulating paints and varnishes and introduced the first ready-to-lay asphalt roll roofing product, trademarked as “Ruberoid”, in 1893, following the unveiling of the new material at an exhibition in Rhode Island in 1891. The Ruberoid product was further enhanced in 1898 when ceramic granules were added to Ruberoid rolls to increase durability and fire resistance. The company subsequently changed its name to The Ruberoid Co. in 1921.

The Ruberoid Co. was listed on the New York Stock Exchange in July 1935. There were 132,602 shares outstanding. The company in 1934 made $8,572,303 in revenue and earned a profit of $415,807.

In 1967, the company merged with General Aniline & Film and launched Timberline, the first-ever laminated shingle to be released. The following year, the company rebranded to GAF.

A new board of directors was established in 1983, with Samuel J. Heyman stepping into the roles of Chairman and CEO. In 1985, GAF Corporation engaged in a hostile takeover bid for Union Carbide, making several offers for the company's stock. After GAF launched its bid, Union Carbide resisted by making a competitive offer to buy back its own shares and taking other defensive measures, such as preparing to sell some of its profitable divisions. GAF eventually withdrew its offer in early 1986 after Carbide restructured, and GAF ended up being a large shareholder in Union Carbide.

In 2007, GAF merged with Elk Corporation, a manufacturer of asphalt felts and coatings. In 2011, GAF became the first roofing manufacturer to offer a Lifetime Limited Warranty on all laminated shingles.

GAF Energy, a sister company which offers affordable integrated rooftop solar options, was launched in 2019. In 2020, the company released Timberline HDZ shingles with LayerLock Technology and began offering the GAF WindProven Limited Wind Warranty, the first wind warranty for roofing shingles with no maximum wind speed limitation on GAF shingles with LayerLock Technology when installed with the required combination of four GAF accessories. That same year, GAF launched GAF Community Matters, a social impact initiative.

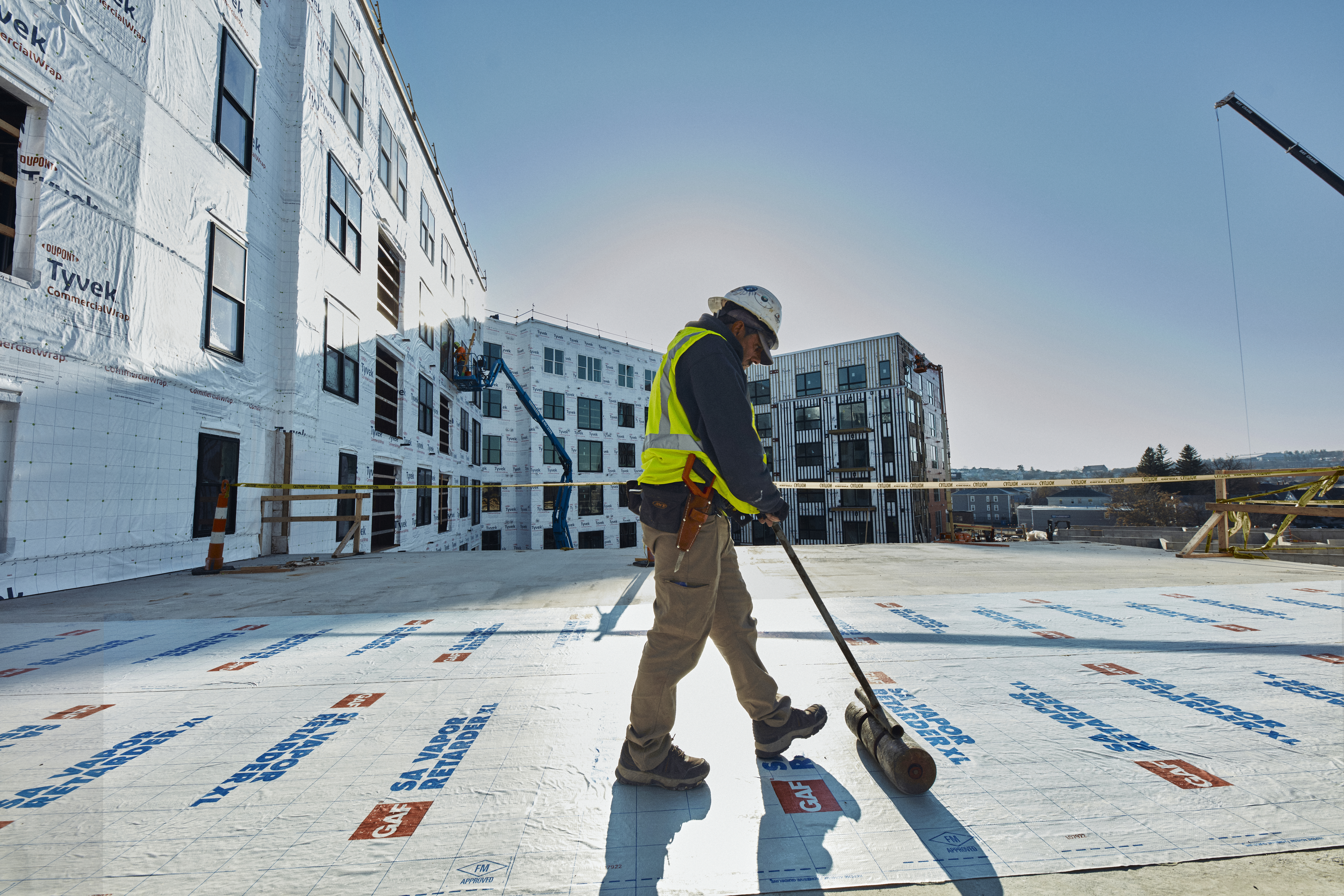
Commercial Roofing Process

In 2021, the company created the GAF RoofCycle Process, a patented recycling process that diverts post-consumer asphalt shingle waste from landfills.

Alongside fellow Standard Industries company GAF Energy, the companies launched Timberline Solar, the world’s first nailable solar shingle, in 2022. GAF disclosed its 2030 Planet Goals that same year, which includes reduced carbon emissions, an 80% waste diversion rate across all manufacturing facilities, and establishing a circular economy into the roofing sector, including the introduction of the GAF RoofCycle process across North America. In the summer of 2022, the company announced the expansion of its commercial manufacturing operations with two new locations in Peru, Illinois and Valdosta, Georgia.

In January 2023, GAF announced the reengineering and relaunch of Timberline Ultra High Definition (UHD) as Timberline UHDZ shingles; new features include LayerLock technology and StrikeZone nailing area, making these shingles easy and fast to install.

In 2024, GAF announced plans to build a new residential roofing shingle manufacturing facility in Kansas.

== Residential warranties ==
GAF offers several tiers of enhanced limited warranties for residential roofing systems, with eligibility depending in part on the certification level of the installing contractor and the qualifying GAF products used in the roofing system. GAF Certified contractors may offer the System Plus Limited Warranty, while Certified Plus contractors may also offer the Silver Pledge Limited Warranty. Master Elite contractors are eligible to offer the Golden Pledge Limited Warranty, and qualifying three-star President's Club Award winners may offer the President's Club Limited Warranty on eligible roofing systems.

GAF's enhanced warranties provide different levels of coverage depending on the warranty selected, including coverage related to manufacturing defects and, under certain enhanced warranties, workmanship or product misapplication. Eligibility requirements, covered products, and coverage periods vary by warranty and roofing system.

== Operations ==
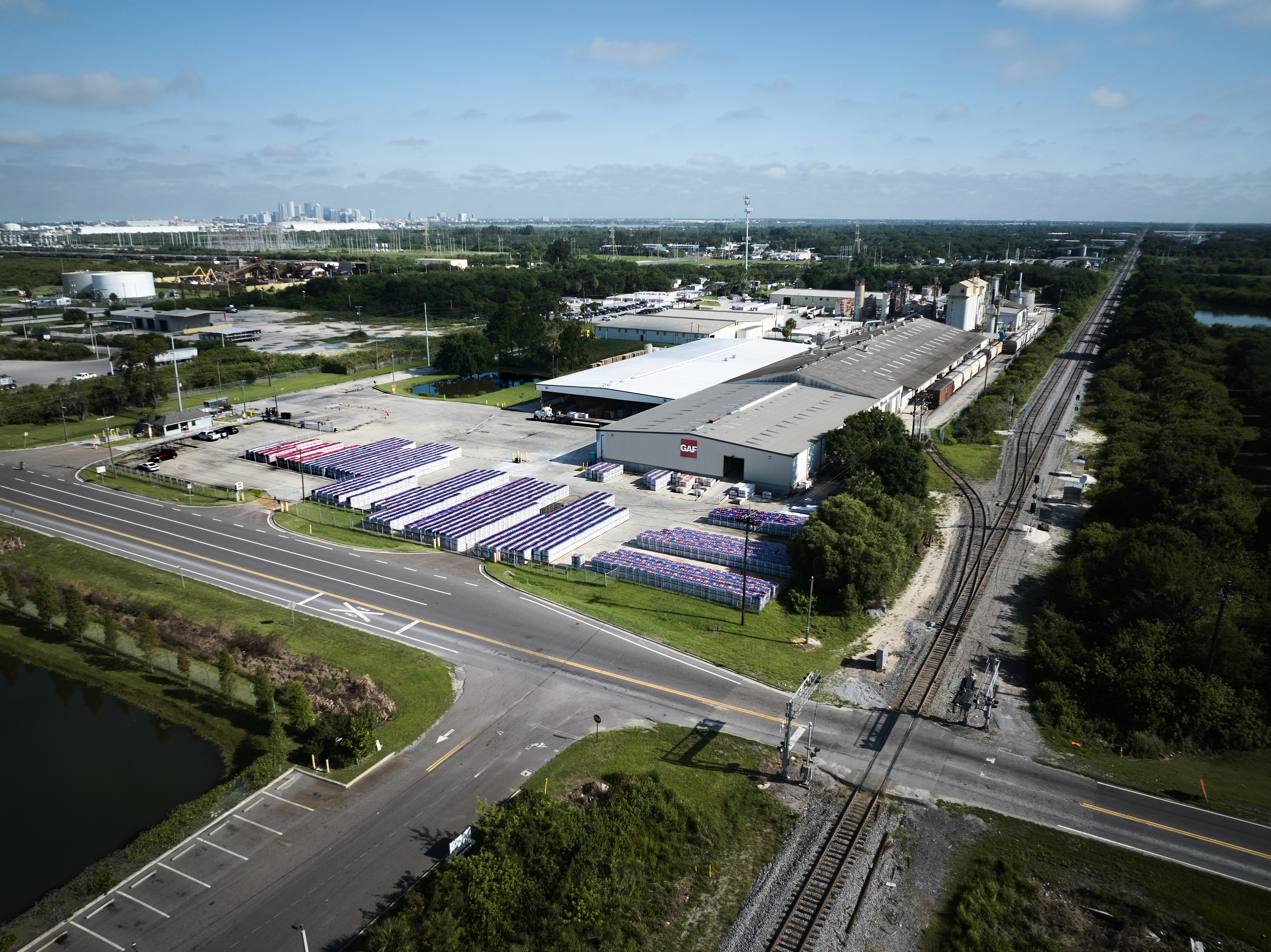
Tampa Manufacturing Facility

GAF products are manufactured at locations across the country which are distributed by national distributors and retailers, such as ABC Supply, The Home Depot, and Lowe's, and are installed by independent roofing contractors. GAF has manufacturing operations across the United States:

== Community Matters ==
The company launched GAF Community Matters, a social impact initiative, in 2020. Since its launch, GAF Community Matters has partnered with Habitat for Humanity, Team Rubicon, and Good360, as well as other non-profit organizations.

In 2022, Community Matters announced a partnership with Anthony Mackie to replace 500 roofs of families in need throughout the Gulf Region that were impacted by severe weather. In July 2022, GAF launched the Cool Community Project, which works to mitigate urban heat island effects by painting hot city surfaces (i.e. pavement) with GAF’s solar-reflective StreetBond pavement coating. The Cool Community Project has partnered with Climate Resolve, as well as other nonprofit partners.

The Community Matters program also includes GAF Roofing Academy, which combines in-classroom and hands-on training to provide individuals with the necessary skills for an entry-level roofing position. The GAF Roofing Academy offers commercial, residential, & solar training and works with contractors nationwide in order to provide trainees with job opportunities. The program has offered training to underrepresented groups, such as women, veterans, and prison inmates.
